= List of integrated development environments =

This is a list of integrated development environments (IDEs), grouped into free or open-source software, online IDEs, educational, mixed-license, open-core, source-available software, proprietary software, and discontinued IDEs.

== Free or open-source IDEs ==
- Android Studio
- Aptana Studio
- Arduino IDE
- BlackBox Component Builder
- Bricx Command Center
- Code::Blocks
- CodeLite
- Dev-C++
- Dev-Pascal
- Eclipse
- Eclipse Theia
- eric
- Fresh
- Gambas
- Geany
- GNOME Builder
- GNU Octave IDE
- HiAsm
- IDLE
- InForm
- KDevelop
- Lazarus
- MCU 8051 IDE
- NetBeans
- Padre
- Pharo
- Poplog
- PyDev
- Qt Creator
- SLIME
- Spyder
- TheIDE
- VisualFBEditor
- ZeroBrane Studio

== Online IDEs ==
- Codeanywhere
- CodePen
- CodeSandbox
- CoCalc
- DartPad
- Eclipse Che
- Firebase Studio
- GitHub Codespaces
- Google AI Studio
- Google Cloud Shell
- Google Colab
- JDoodle
- JupyterLab
- Kaggle Notebooks
- PythonAnywhere
- Replit
- SourceLair

== Educational IDEs ==
- Actor-Lab
- AgentCubes
- AgentSheets
- Alice
- Basic-256
- Basic4GL
- BlueJ
- Catrobat
- Ch
- CodeMonkey
- DialogOS
- DrJava
- DrRacket
- Etoys
- GAMA Platform
- Greenfoot
- jGRASP
- Kodu Game Lab
- Kojo
- Mama
- Microsoft Small Basic
- NetLogo
- Open Roberta
- PascalABC.NET
- Raptor
- Scratch
- ScratchJr
- Sense
- SmallBASIC
- Snap!
- StarLogo
- Swift Playgrounds
- Thonny
- Toolbox
- ToonTalk
- Turtlestitch
- Tynker
- Visual Logic

== Mixed-license, open-core, or source-available IDEs ==
- EiffelStudio
- IntelliJ IDEA
- PyCharm
- RStudio
- Visual Studio Code

== Proprietary IDEs ==
- Adobe Dreamweaver
- Basic4android
- C++Builder
- CLion
- Code Composer Studio
- CodeCharge Studio
- Codelobster
- CODESYS
- CodeWarrior
- Cubic IDE
- Cursor
- DataGrip
- DataSpell
- Delphi
- Enterprise Architect
- Flowcode
- GeneXus
- GoLand
- Google Antigravity
- JDeveloper
- LabVIEW
- LabWindows/CVI
- LispWorks
- LiveCode
- Microsoft Visual Studio
- MyEclipse
- NS Basic
- Omnis Studio
- OptimalJ
- Oracle Forms
- Oracle Solaris Studio
- PhpStorm
- PowerBuilder
- Powerflasher FDT
- PureBasic
- Rational Software Architect
- Rider
- RubyMine
- RustRover
- SAP NetWeaver Developer Studio
- Simply Fortran
- SlickEdit
- Understand
- Uniface
- Visual LANSA
- Visual Prolog
- VisualWorks
- WebStorm
- Wing IDE
- Xcode
- Xojo

== Discontinued IDEs ==
- AWS Cloud9 IDE
- Adobe ColdFusion Builder
- Flash Builder
- Anjuta
- AppCode
- Basic4ppc
- Borland C++
- Genera
- JBuilder
- Komodo IDE
- Light Table
- MonoDevelop
- PHPEdit
- QuickC
- RadRails
- RapidQ
- Rational R1000
- SharpDevelop
- Softbench
- Sun Java Studio Creator
- THINK C
- Turbo C++
- Turbo Delphi
- Turbo Pascal
- Visual Basic (classic)
- Visual Café
- Visual Eiffel
- Visual InterDev
- VisualAge
- VX-REXX
- Xerox Development Environment
- Zend Studio

== See also ==
- Comparison of integrated development environments
- Comparison of text editors and list of text editors
- Graphical user interface builder
- List of AI-assisted software development tools
- Lists of programming software development tools
- Source-code editor
- Text editor
- Wikipedia development environment – Wikipedia's Source editor and VisualEditor
