= Comparison of integrated development environments =

Notable software packages that are nominal IDE

== ActionScript ==
IDE	License	Windows	Linux	macOS	Other platforms	Debugger	GUI builder	Profiler	Static code analysis	MXML	Export to Mobile
Adobe Animate	Proprietary	Yes	No	Yes	JVM	Yes	Yes	Yes	Yes	Yes	Yes
Flash Builder	Proprietary	Yes	No	Yes	JVM	Yes	Yes	Yes	Yes	Yes	Yes
IntelliJ IDEA	Proprietary	Yes	Yes	Yes	FreeBSD, OpenBSD, Solaris	Yes	No	Yes	Yes	Yes	Yes
Powerflasher FDT	Proprietary	Yes	Yes	Yes	JVM	Yes	No	Yes	Yes	Yes	Yes

== Ada ==
IDE	License	Windows	Linux	macOS	Other platforms	Debugger	GUI builder	Toolchain	Profiler	Code coverage	Autocomplete	Static code analysis	GUI-based design	Class browser	Latest stable release
Eclipse w/ AonixADT	EPL	Yes	Yes	Yes	FreeBSD, JVM, Solaris	Yes	Yes	No	Unknown	Unknown	Yes	Unknown	No	Yes	December 2009
SlickEdit	Proprietary	Yes	Yes	Yes	Solaris, Solaris SPARC, AIX, HP-UX	Yes	No	No	No	No	Yes	No	No	Yes	2018
Understand	Proprietary	Yes	Yes	Yes	Solaris	No	No	No	No	No	Yes	Yes	No	Yes	December 2015

== Assembly ==
IDE	License	Windows	Linux	macOS	Other platforms	Debugger	Assemblers	Auto-complete	Macros/templates	Latest stable release
Fresh	EUPL and 2-clause BSD	Yes	Yes	No	Unknown	No	FASM	Unknown	Unknown	1.73.04 / April 30, 2018
SASM	GPL	Yes	Yes	No	Unknown	Yes	NASM, MASM, GAS and FASM	Yes	Yes	3.10.1 / 8 October 2018
SlickEdit	Proprietary	Yes	Yes	Yes	Solaris, Solaris SPARC, AIX, HP-UX	No	MASM, High Level Assembly, Linux Assembly, OS/390 Assembly	Yes	Yes	2018

== BASIC ==
IDE	License	Windows	Linux	macOS	Developer	Other platforms	Latest stable release
Basic4android	Proprietary	Yes	No	No	Anywhere Software	cross-compile from Windows to Android	2018-03-20
Gambas	GPL	No	Yes	No	Benoît Minisini	FreeBSD, Cygwin	2019-11-19
Microsoft Small Basic	MIT License	Yes	No	No	Microsoft		2015-10-01
MonoDevelop	LGPL	Yes	Yes	Yes	Xamarin and the Mono community	FreeBSD, OpenBSD, Solaris	2016-01-28
PBASIC Stamp Editor	Proprietary	Yes	No	Yes	Parallax Inc		2014-07-02
PureBasic	Proprietary	Yes	Yes	Yes	Fantaisie Software	AmigaOS	2024-03-27
SharpDevelop	MIT	Yes	No	No	ICSharpCode Team		2015-07-14
SlickEdit	Proprietary	Yes	Yes	Yes	SlickEdit	Solaris, Solaris SPARC, AIX, HP-UX	2018
Xojo	Proprietary	Yes	Yes	Yes	Xojo, Inc.	Web	2015-12-17

== C/C++ ==
IDE	License	Windows	Linux	macOS	Other platforms	Written in	Debugger	GUI builder	Integrated toolchain	Profiler	Code coverage	Autocomplete	Static code analysis	GUI-based design	Class browser	Latest stable release	C compiler	C++ compiler	Refactoring
Anjuta (abandoned)	GPL	No	Yes	No	FreeBSD	C	Yes	Yes	Yes	Yes	No	Yes	No	Yes	Yes	2016-03	Yes	Yes	No
AppCode (IntelliJ IDEA)	Proprietary	No	No	Yes		Java	Yes	Yes	No	Yes (Xcode profiler)	No	Yes	Yes	Yes	Yes	2012-12	Yes (Xcode toolchain)	Yes (Xcode toolchain)	Yes
C++Builder	Proprietary, Freeware (Starter edition only)	Yes	No (Cross compiler planned)	Yes (Cross compiler)	cross-compiles for Android and iOS	C++ and Object Pascal	Yes	Yes	Yes	Yes (AQTime Standard in package manager)	Yes	Yes	Yes	Yes	Yes	2017-03 Tokyo 10.2	Yes	Yes	Yes
Code::Blocks	GPL	Yes	Yes	Yes	FreeBSD, OpenBSD, Solaris	C++	Yes	Yes	Yes	Yes	Yes	Yes	Yes	Yes	Yes	2025-03	Yes (MinGW + custom)	Yes (MinGW + custom)	Yes
CodeLite	GPL	Yes	Yes	Yes	FreeBSD	C++	Yes	Yes	Yes	Yes (As of CodeLite 6.1, integration with Valgrind)	No	Yes	Yes	Yes	Yes	2025-01-09	Yes (GCC, Clang, VC + custom)	Yes (GCC, Clang, VC + custom)	Yes
Dev-C++	GPL	Yes	No	No	FreeBSD	Object Pascal	Yes	No	Yes	Yes	No	Yes	No	Yes	Yes	2021-01-30	Yes	Yes	No
Eclipse CDT	EPL	Yes	Yes	Yes	FreeBSD, JVM, Solaris	C++, Java	Yes	Yes	Yes	Yes	Yes	Yes	Yes	Yes	Yes	2020-06	External	External	Yes
Geany	GPL	Yes	Yes	Yes	FreeBSD, AIX, OpenBSD, Solaris, other Unix	C	Yes (via a plug-in)	No	No	No	No	Yes	No	No	Yes	2019-04	External	External	No
JetBrains CLion	Proprietary	Yes	Yes	Yes		Java	Yes	No	Yes	No	No	Yes	Yes	No	Yes	2019-07	Yes (customizable)	Yes (customizable)	Yes
KDevelop	GPL	Yes	Yes	Yes	FreeBSD, Solaris	C/C++	Yes	Yes	Yes	Yes	Yes	Yes	Yes	Yes	Yes	2022-12-08	External	External	Yes
LabWindows/CVI	Proprietary	Yes	No	No	cross-compile to Linux, Phar Lap ETS	?	Yes	Yes	Yes	Yes	No	Yes	No	Yes	—N/a	2016-12	Yes	No	No
Microsoft Visual Studio	Proprietary, Freeware (Community edition only)	Yes	Yes (Cross compiler)	No	Mac OS 7 (v2.x-v4.x only)	C++ and C#	Yes	Yes	Yes	Yes	Yes	Yes	Yes	Yes	Yes	2019-04	Yes	Yes	Yes (also plugin)
Visual Studio Code	MIT	Yes	Yes	Yes		TypeScript JavaScript CSS	Yes	No	Yes	No	No	Yes	No	Yes	Yes	2026-10-14	External	External	
MonoDevelop	LGPL	Yes	Yes	Yes	FreeBSD, OpenBSD, Solaris	C#	Yes	Yes	Yes	No	No	Yes	No	Yes	Yes	2016-11	Yes (GCC + custom)	Yes (GCC + custom)	Yes
NetBeans C/C++ pack	Apache License	Yes	Yes	Yes	OpenBSD, Solaris	Java	Yes	Yes	No	No	Yes	No	Yes	Yes	?	2025-08-22	External	Yes	
OpenWatcom	Sybase Open Watcom Public License	No (32-bit only)	Partial	No	FreeBSD, DOS	C/C++	Yes (GUI)	Yes	Yes	Yes	No	No	No	Yes	Yes	2010-06	Yes	Yes	No
Oracle Solaris Studio	Proprietary, Freeware	No	Yes	No	Solaris	?	Yes	Yes	Yes	Yes	Yes	Yes	Yes	Yes	Yes	2008-11	Yes	Yes	Yes
Pelles C IDE	Proprietary, Freeware	Yes	No	No		C	Yes	No	Yes	?	?	?	?	?	?	2025-05-21	Yes	Yes	?
Qt Creator	GPL / LGPL / Proprietary	Yes	Yes	Yes	FreeBSD, Maemo, OpenBSD, Symbian	C++	Yes	Yes	Yes	Yes	No	Yes	Yes (clang)	Yes	Yes Rational Software Architect (Eclipse IBM)	2025-06-18	Yes	Yes	No
SlickEdit	Proprietary	Yes	Yes	Yes	Solaris, Solaris SPARC, AIX, HP-UX	C++	Yes	No	Yes	No	No	Yes	No	Yes	Yes	2018-12	External	External	Yes
U++ TheIDE	BSD	Yes	Yes	Yes	FreeBSD, Solaris	C++	No	Yes	Yes	No	No	Yes	No	Yes	Yes	2022-12	External	External	No
Understand	Proprietary	Yes	Yes	Yes	Solaris	?	No	No	No	No	No	Yes	Yes	No	Yes	2015-12	No	No	Yes
Xcode (Apple)	Proprietary	No	No	Yes	cross compiles to iOS	C, C++, Objective-C, Objective-C++	Yes	Yes	Yes	Yes	Yes	Yes	Yes	Yes	Yes	2025-12	No, llvm (llvm-gcc and gcc deprecated)	Yes, llvm (llvm-gcc and gcc deprecated)	No

== C# ==
IDE	License	Developer	Latest stable release	Windows	Linux	macOS	Other platforms
Microsoft Visual Studio	Proprietary Community Edition: Freeware	Microsoft	17.14.7 / June 23, 2025	Yes	No	Yes	
MonoDevelop	LGPL	Xamarin and the Mono community	7.6.9.22 / September 21, 2018	Yes	Yes	Yes	FreeBSD, OpenBSD, Solaris
SharpDevelop	MIT	IC#Code Team	5.1 / April 14, 2016	Yes	No	No	
SlickEdit	Proprietary	SlickEdit	October 2016	Yes	Yes	Yes	Solaris, Solaris SPARC, AIX, HP-UX
Understand	Proprietary	SciTools	814 / December 4, 2015	Yes	Yes	Yes	Solaris
Visual Studio Code	source code(MIT License) - binary(Proprietary)	Microsoft	1.142.0 / 14 October 2026	Yes	Yes	Yes	
Xamarin Studio	source code(MIT License) - binary(Proprietary)	Microsoft	December 2016	Yes	Yes	Yes	
Eclipse	EPL	Eclipse Foundation	4.7 / June 28, 2017	Yes	Yes	Yes	
Rider	Proprietary	JetBrains	2024.3 / November 13, 2024	Yes	Yes	Yes	

== Lisp ==
=== Common Lisp ===
IDE	License	Windows	Linux	macOS	Other platforms	Editor	Debugger	GUI builder	Profiler	Browsers
Allegro Common Lisp	Proprietary	Yes	Yes	Yes	FreeBSD, HP-UX, AIX, Solaris, Tru64 UNIX	Yes	Yes	Yes	Yes	Class browser, Systems, Definitions
LispWorks	Proprietary	Yes	Yes	Yes	FreeBSD, HP-UX, Solaris	Yes	Yes	Yes	Yes	Class browser, Functions, Errors, Processes, Symbols, Systems
SLIME (Emacs)	portions in GPL v2, LGPL, BSD and public domain	Yes	Yes	Yes	DragonFly BSD, FreeBSD, HP-UX, AIX, IRIX, DOS, NetBSD, OpenBSD, OpenVMS, OS/2, Solaris, other Unix	Yes	Yes	No	Yes	Class browser, Errors, Symbols

=== Emacs Lisp ===
IDE	License	Windows	Linux	macOS	Other platforms	Editor	Debugger	GUI builder	Profiler	Limitations
GNU Emacs	GPLv3	Yes	Yes	Yes	FreeBSD, OpenBSD, Haiku	Yes (built-in)	Yes (Edebug, IELM)	Yes (via packages like Emacs Widget Library)	Yes (e.g., elp, profiler.el)	General-purpose text editor extended into a full IDE via Lisp

== Component Pascal ==
IDE	License	Developer	Platform
BlackBox Component Builder	Proprietary similar to Sleepycat	Oberon microsystems	Windows

== D ==
IDE	Widget toolkit	Platform	Compilers	Open source	Made in D	Notes
Visual Studio	Microsoft	Windows	DMD, LDC (LLVM), GDC (GCC)	No	No	Visual Studio extension. VisualD, wrote in D.
NetBeans	Java Swing	Windows, macOS, Linux, FreeBSD, Solaris, OpenIndiana, Java	DMD, LDC (LLVM), GDC (GCC)	Yes	No	NetBeans module. NetBeans-D, under MIT License.
SlickEdit	Qt	Windows, Linux, macOS, AIX, HP-UX, Solaris, Solaris SPARC	DMD	No	No	
CodeLite	wxWidget	Windows, macOS, Linux, FreeBSD, Solaris, OpenIndiana	DMD, LDC (LLVM), GDC (GCC)	Yes	No	
Xcode	Cocoa	macOS	DMD, GDC (GCC)	No	No	Xcode plugin. D for Xcode, under GPL v2.
MonoDevelop	GTK#	Windows, macOS, Linux, FreeBSD, Solaris, OpenIndiana	DMD, LDC (LLVM), GDC (GCC)	Yes	No	MonoDevelop extension. Mono-D, support VisualD projects and DUB, Can be installed on Xamarin Studio too, under Apache License.
KDevelop	Qt	Windows, macOS, Linux, FreeBSD, Solaris, OpenIndiana	DMD, LDC (LLVM), GDC (GCC)	Yes	No	
Geany	GTK+	Windows, macOS, Linux, FreeBSD, Solaris, OpenIndiana	DMD, LDC (LLVM), GDC (GCC)	Yes	No	Native support.
Code::Blocks	wxWidget	Windows, macOS, Linux, FreeBSD, Solaris, OpenIndiana	DMD, LDC (LLVM), GDC (GCC)	Yes	No	Includes partial support.
Eclipse	SWT	Windows, macOS, Linux, FreeBSD, Solaris, OpenIndiana, Java	DMD	Yes	No	Eclipse Plugin. DDT. Dropped.

== Eiffel ==
IDE	License	Windows	Linux	macOS	Other platforms	Debugger	GUI builder	Toolchain	Profiler	Code coverage	Autocomplete	Static code analysis	GUI-based design	Class browser	Latest stable release
EiffelStudio	GPL and commercial	Yes	Yes	Yes	FreeBSD, OpenVMS, Solaris, VxWorks, other Unix	Yes	Yes	Yes	Yes	Automatic testing framework	Yes	Type checking, Void-safety, Metrics tool	BON / UML class diagramming	Multi-view	20.05, 2020

== Erlang ==
Go to this page: Source code editors for Erlang

== Fortran ==
IDE	License	Platform	Developer	Latest stable release
Code::Blocks	GPL	Windows, Linux, macOS, FreeBSD, OpenBSD, Solaris	Code::Blocks Team	25.03 / March 31, 2025
Geany	GPL	Windows, Linux, macOS, FreeBSD, AIX, OpenBSD, Solaris, other Unix	Team	1.37.1 / November 8, 2020
KDevelop	GPL	Linux	KDevelop Team	5.5.1 (May 5, 2020; 6 years ago) [±]
NetBeans	Apache License	Windows, Linux, macOS	NetBeans Community	31 (5 August 2026) [±]
OpenWatcom	OSI Approved	Windows, Linux, DOS, OS/2	OpenWatcom Community	1.9 / June 2, 2010
Understand	Proprietary	Windows, Linux, macOS, Solaris, other Unix	SciTools	December 4, 2015
Simply Fortran	Proprietary	Windows, Linux, macOS	Approximatrix, LLC	3.38 / December 20, 2024
SlickEdit	Proprietary	Windows, Linux, macOS, AIX, Solaris, Solaris SPARC, HP-UX	SlickEdit	October 2016
IntelliJ IDEA	ASLv2	Windows, Linux, macOS, FreeBSD, OpenBSD, Solaris	JetBrains	September 2017

== F# ==
IDE	License	Windows	Linux	macOS	Developer
Microsoft Visual Studio	Proprietary (standard); Freeware (community edition)	Yes	No	Yes	Microsoft
Visual Studio Code	Proprietary (binary code); MIT License (source code)	Yes	Yes	Yes	Microsoft
Rider	Proprietary	Yes	Yes	Yes	JetBrains

== Groovy ==
IDE	License	Written in Java only	Windows	Linux	macOS	Other platforms	GUI builder
Eclipse GDT	EPL	No	Yes	Yes	Yes	FreeBSD, JVM, Solaris	No
IntelliJ IDEA	ASLv2, proprietary	Yes	Yes	Yes	Yes	FreeBSD, OpenBSD, Solaris	No
NetBeans	Apache License	Yes	Yes	Yes	Yes	FreeBSD, OpenBSD, Solaris	Yes
SlickEdit	Proprietary	No	Yes	Yes	Yes	Solaris, Solaris SPARC, AIX, HP-UX	No

== Haskell ==
IDE	License	Platforms	Latest stable release	Developer
EclipseFP plugin	EPL?	JVM	2.6.4 / January 19, 2015	eclipsefp.github.io
SlickEdit	Proprietary	Windows, Linux, macOS, AIX, HP-UX, Solaris, Solaris SPARC	October 2016	SlickEdit

== Haxe ==
Go to this page: Comparison of IDE choices for Haxe programmers

== Java ==
Java has strong IDE support, due not only to its historical and economic importance, but also due to a combination of reflection and static-typing making it well-suited for IDE support. Some of the leading Java IDEs (such as IntelliJ and Eclipse) are also the basis for leading IDEs in other programming languages (e.g. for Python, IntelliJ is rebranded as PyCharm, and Eclipse has the PyDev plugin.)

=== Open ===
IDE	License	LSP	Written in Java only	Windows	Linux	macOS	Other platforms	GUI builder	Profiling	RDBMS	EE	Limitations
Android Studio	Apache License (based on IntelliJ IDEA)	No	Yes	Yes	Yes	Yes	ChromeOS	Yes	Yes	Yes	No	Not a general-purpose IDE; focused on Android app development
BlueJ	GPL2+GNU linking exception	No	Yes	Yes	Yes	Yes	Solaris	No				Not a General IDE; a small scale UML editor
DrJava	Permissive	No	Yes	Yes	Yes	Yes	Solaris	No				Java 8 only (2014)
Eclipse JDT	EPL	Yes	No	Yes	Yes	Yes	FreeBSD, JVM, Solaris	Yes	Yes	Yes	Yes	
Geany	GPL	No	No	Yes	Yes	Yes	FreeBSD, AIX, OpenBSD, Solaris, other Unix	No				
Greenfoot	GPL	No	Yes	Yes	Yes	Yes	Solaris	No				Not a General IDE; a 2D Game builder
NetBeans	Apache License	No	Yes	Yes	Yes	Yes	FreeBSD, OpenBSD, Solaris	Yes	Yes	Yes	Yes	Multi folder Maven not supported
IntelliJ IDEA Community Edition	Apache License v2.0	No	Yes	Yes	Yes	Yes	FreeBSD, OpenBSD, Solaris	Yes	No	No	No	
Visual Studio Code	MIT License	Yes	No	Yes	Yes	Yes		Yes				Needs Eclipse plugin. No stack trace console.
Vim	Vim	Plugin	No	Yes	Yes	Yes	BSD, Unix, iOS, Android, Haiku, AmigaOS, MorphOS	No				Needs configuration for IDE features

=== Closed ===
IDE	License	Written in Java only	Windows	Linux	macOS	Other platforms	GUI builder	Limitations
IntelliJ IDEA Ultimate Edition	Proprietary	Yes	Yes	Yes	Yes	FreeBSD, OpenBSD, Solaris	Yes	
JBuilder	Proprietary	Yes	Yes	Yes	Yes	Solaris	Yes	
JDeveloper	Proprietary (freeware)	Yes	Yes	Yes	Yes	generic JVM	Yes	
jGRASP	Proprietary (freeware)	Yes	Yes	Yes	Yes		No	
MyEclipse	Proprietary	Yes	Yes	Yes	Yes	FreeBSD, JVM, Solaris	Yes	
Rational Application Developer	Proprietary	Yes	Yes	Yes	No	AIX, Solaris	Yes	
SlickEdit	Proprietary	No	Yes	Yes	Yes	Solaris, Solaris SPARC, AIX, HP-UX	No	
Understand	Proprietary	No	Yes	Yes	Yes	Solaris	Yes	
Xcode (Apple)	Proprietary	No	No	No	Yes		Yes	No code formatting

== JavaScript ==
IDE	Developer	Latest stable release	Platform	License	Written in
Anjuta (abandoned)	Anjuta Team	3.28.0 / March 11, 2018	Unix-like	GPL	C
Atom	GitHub (subsidiary of Microsoft)	1.63.1 / 23 November 2022	Cross-platform	MIT License	JavaScript
Brackets	Adobe	September 2017	Cross-platform	MIT License	JavaScript, HTML, CSS
Aptana Studio	Aptana, Inc.	December 2013	Cross-platform	GPL, proprietary	Java, JavaScript
Codeanywhere	Codeanywhere, Inc.	August 2015	Cloud IDE	Proprietary	JavaScript
CodeLite	CodeLite	17.0.0 January 2023	Cross-platform	GPL	C++
Eclipse Web Tools	Eclipse Foundation		Windows, Linux, macOS, FreeBSD, JVM, Solaris	EPL	C, Java
Komodo IDE / Edit	ActiveState	November 19, 2013	Cross-platform	IDE:Proprietary, Edit:MPL 1.1	C, C++, JavaScript, Perl, Python, Tcl, XUL
NetBeans	Apache	31 (5 August 2026) [±]	Cross-platform	Apache License	Java
Oracle JDeveloper	Oracle Corporation	July 2013	Windows, Linux, macOS	Proprietary – free	Java
SlickEdit	SlickEdit	October 2016	Windows, Linux, macOS, Solaris, AIX, HP-UX	Proprietary	C++
Visual Studio	Microsoft	March 31, 2016	Windows	Proprietary	C++, C#
Visual Studio Code	Microsoft	1.142.0 / 14 October 2026	Cross-platform	MIT License	JavaScript
WebStorm	JetBrains	2019.1/ 25 March 2019	Cross-platform	Proprietary	Java

== Julia ==
IDE	License	Windows	Linux	macOS	Other platforms	Debugger	Profiler	Notes
Atom (with Juno extension)	MIT License	Yes	Yes	Yes	?	Yes	Yes	Has a plotting pane. Juno team merged with VS Code extension team (see below); Juno now in maintenance mode.
Emacs / spacemacs	portions in GPL v2, LGPL, BSD and public domain	Yes	Yes	Yes	FreeBSD	Yes	Yes	ESS extension support for emacs. vi support also available, e.g. in spacemacs (useful for pair programming).
Visual Studio Code (using the Julia extension)	MIT License	Yes	Yes	Yes	FreeBSD	Yes	Yes (i.e. flame graph viewing support)	Has a plotting pane. License is for the extension; and Microsoft's source code (only).

== Lua ==
IDE	Developer	Latest stable release	Platform	License
Decoda	Unknown Worlds Entertainment	1.16 / October 25, 2011	Windows	GPL
SlickEdit	SlickEdit	October 2016	Windows, Linux, macOS, AIX, HP-UX, Solaris, Solaris SPARC	Proprietary
ZeroBrane Studio	Paul Kulchenko, ZeroBrane LLC	1.80 / October 7, 2018	Windows, macOS/Mac, Linux	MIT License

== Pascal, Object Pascal ==
IDE	Developer	Latest stable release	Windows	Linux	macOS	Other platforms	Mobiles	Debugger	GUI builder	License	Autocomplete
Delphi	Embarcadero Technologies	Delphi 10.4.2 (Sydney) / February 24 2021	Yes	No	No	cross-compile to macOS, Android, iOS Linux	Yes	Yes	Yes	Proprietary	Yes
Free Pascal IDE	Volunteers	3.2.2 / May 20, 2021	Yes	Yes	Yes	AmigaOS, Android, FreeBSD, Game Boy Advance, Haiku, AIX, iOS, MorphOS, DOS, NetBSD, Nintendo DS, Nintendo Wii, OpenBSD, OS/2, Solaris, Windows CE, JVM, LLVM (experimental), JavaScript transpiler, Embedded systems.	Yes	Yes	No	GPL; LGPL with static linking exception	No
KDevelop	KDevelop Team	5.5.1 (May 5, 2020; 6 years ago) [±] (only 3.x supports Pascal)	Yes	Yes	Yes	FreeBSD, OpenBSD, NetBSD, Solaris, other Unix	No	No	No	GPL	
Lazarus	Volunteers	4.6.0 / February 25, 2026	Yes	Yes	Yes	See Free Pascal	Yes	Yes	Yes	GPL; LGPL with static linking exception	Yes
Morfik	Morfik Technology Pty Ltd.	2.0.5.27	Yes	Yes	Yes	compiles to HTML+CSS+XML+JavaScript (web apps)	Yes	Yes	Yes	Proprietary	
MSEide	Martin Schreiber	4.6 / 2017-11-24	Yes	Yes	No	FreeBSD	Yes	Yes	Yes	GPL; LGPL with static linking exception for the library MSEgui	
Understand	SciTools	4.0 / April 2015	Yes	Yes	Yes	Solaris	Yes	No	Yes	Proprietary	
Visual Studio via Oxygene	RemObjects Software	10.0 / August 2018	Yes and additional Water IDE	No	Yes via Fire IDE	JVM, .NET, Mono, Cocoa, Cocoa Touch, Android, iOS, WebAssembly, cross compile to Linux	Yes	Yes	Yes	Proprietary; free compiler	Yes
Dev-Pascal	Bloodshed Software	1.9.2 (using FPC 1.9.2 from 2005)	Yes	No	No		No	Yes	No	GPL	
PascalABC.NET	PascalABC.NET Compiler Team	3.9 / July 10, 2023	Yes	Yes	Yes	compiles to CLR	No	Yes	Yes	LGPL	Yes

== Perl ==
IDE	Developer	Latest stable release	Platform	License
Eclipse EPIC	EPIC Project Team	0.6.44 / April 18, 2012	Windows, Linux, macOS, FreeBSD, JVM, Solaris	CPL
Geany	Team	1.37.1 / November 8, 2020	Windows, Linux, macOS, FreeBSD, AIX, OpenBSD, Solaris, other Unix	GPL
Komodo IDE / Edit	ActiveState	9.0.1 / April 19, 2015	Cross-platform	Proprietary
NetBeans	Sun Microsystems / Oracle	31 (5 August 2026) [±]	Cross-platform	Apache License
Padre	Padre Team	1.0 / November 8, 2013	Cross-platform	Perl
JetBrains IDEs (via plugin)	Alexandr Evstigneev	2019.1.3 / May 25, 2019	Cross-platform	Apache 2.0
SlickEdit	SlickEdit	October 2016	Windows, Linux, macOS, AIX, Solaris, HP-UX	Proprietary

== PHP ==
IDE	Developer	Latest stable release	Platform	License	Autocomplete	Debugger	Refactoring support	VCS Support
Adobe Dreamweaver	Adobe Systems	-	Cross-platform	Proprietary	Yes	No	No	No
Aptana Studio	Aptana, Inc.	December 2013, 3.5.0	Cross-platform	GPL, proprietary	Yes	Yes	No	via plugins
CodeLite	CodeLite	January 2023, 17.0	Cross-platform	GPL	Yes	Yes	No	Git, SVN
Codelobster	Codelobster	2.4 / September 11, 2023	Cross-platform	Proprietary	Yes	Yes	No	via plugins
Eclipse Che	Eclipse Foundation / Zend	4.7 / September 2, 2016	Cross-platform	EPL	Yes	Yes	Yes	Unknown
Eclipse PDT	Eclipse Foundation / Zend	7.0 / December 18, 2019	Windows, Linux, macOS, FreeBSD, JVM, Solaris	EPL	Yes	Yes	Yes	CVS, Git, Mercurial, SVN (via plugins)
Geany	Geany Team	1.37.1 / November 8, 2020	Windows, Linux, macOS, FreeBSD, AIX, OpenBSD, Solaris, other Unix	GPL	Yes	No	No	via plugins
HyperEdit	Jonathan Deutsch / Tumult	1.6 / April 30, 2008	macOS	Proprietary	Yes	No	No	No
KDevelop	KDE KDevelop Team	5.5.1 (May 5, 2020; 6 years ago) [±]	Cross-platform	GPL	Yes	No	Unknown	CVS, Git, SVN
Komodo IDE / Edit	ActiveState	10.0.1 (June 2016)	Cross-platform	Proprietary	Yes	Yes	Yes	Bazaar, CVS, Git, Mercurial, Perforce, SVN
NetBeans	Sun Microsystems / Oracle	31 (5 August 2026) [±]	Cross-platform on Netbeans	Apache License	Yes	Yes	Yes	CVS, Git, Mercurial, SVN
PHPEclipse (Eclipse)	PHPEclipse project team	1.2.2 / September 2009	Windows, Linux, macOS, FreeBSD, JVM, Solaris	CPL	Yes	Yes	Unknown	Unknown
PHPEdit	WaterProof SARL	3.6.4 (April 9, 2010; 16 years ago) [±]	Windows	Proprietary	Yes	Yes	No	CVS, SVN
PhpStorm (IntelliJ IDEA)	JetBrains	2019.1 / 28 March 2019	Windows, Linux, macOS, FreeBSD, OpenBSD, Solaris	Proprietary	Yes	Yes	Yes	CVS, Git, Mercurial, Perforce, SVN
SlickEdit	SlickEdit	October 2016	Windows, Linux, macOS, AIX, HP-UX, Solaris	Proprietary	Yes	Yes	No	Yes
Zend Studio	Zend	10.6 / February 2014	Cross-platform	Proprietary	Yes	Yes	Yes	CVS, Git, SVN, others (via plugins)

== Python ==
=== Active ===
Python IDEs in active development

IDE	Developer	Latest stable release version	Latest stable release date	Platform	Written in	Widget toolkit	License	Python 2.x support	Python 3.x support	Debugger	GUI builder	Integrated toolchain	Profiler	Code coverage	Autocomplete	Static program analysis	GUI based design	Class browser	Code refactoring	Version control system support	Web framework support
eric	Detlev Offenbach	25.10	2025-09-29	Windows, Linux, macOS	Python	PyQt	GPLv3 "or later"	Yes, until version 4.5.25 and since version 5.5.0	Yes, since version 5.0.0	Yes, for Python 2 & 3	Yes: Qt Creator	Unknown	Yes	Yes	Yes	Multiple integrated checkers and Pylint via plug-in	Yes	Yes	Yes	Subversion and Mercurial (core plug-ins), git (optional plug-in)	Django as optional plug-in
Geany	Team	2.1	2025-07-06	Windows, Linux, macOS, FreeBSD, AIX, OpenBSD, Solaris, other Unix	C	GTK+	GPL	Unknown	Yes	No	Unknown	Unknown	Unknown	Unknown	Yes	Unknown	Unknown	Unknown	Unknown	Unknown	Unknown
KDevelop	KDE KDevelop Team	25.8.1	2025-09	Cross-platform	C, C++	Qt	GPL	Unknown	Yes	Yes	Unknown	Unknown	Unknown	Unknown	Yes	Unknown	Unknown	Yes	Yes	Bazaar, CVS, Git, Mercurial, Perforce, SVN	Unknown
PyCharm	JetBrains	2025.2.2	2025-09-22	Windows, Linux, macOS	Java, Python	Swing	Open core: Full version under Apache License 2.0	Yes	Yes	Yes	Unknown	Yes	Yes (full version only)	Yes (full version only)	Yes	Yes PEP 8 and others	Yes	Yes	Yes	Yes	Yes
PyDev / LiClipse (plug-in for Eclipse and Aptana)	Appcelerator	13.1.0	2025-09-21	Windows, Linux, macOS, FreeBSD, JVM, Solaris	Python	SWT	EPL	Yes	Yes	Yes (also remote, container, cluster, multi-threaded, and multi-process debugging)	Unknown	Unknown	Unknown	Unknown	Yes	Yes	Unknown	Yes	Yes	Yes	Yes
Spyder	Team	6.0.8	2025-08-27	Windows, Linux, macOS, Qt	Python	Qt5/Qt6 with PyQt or PySide	MIT	Yes	Yes	Yes	Unknown	Yes	Yes	Unknown	Yes	Yes	Yes	Yes	Yes	Yes	Unknown
VS Code	Microsoft	1.140.0	2026-09-30	Cross-platform	C++ and C#	Windows Forms and WPF, through IronPython	MIT	Yes	Yes	Yes	No	Unknown	Unknown	Unknown	Yes	Unknown	Unknown	Yes	Basic refactoring	Yes	Yes
Wing	Wingware	12.1.2	2026-03-10	Windows, Linux, macOS	Python	Qt5 with PyQt	Proprietary	Yes	Yes	Yes (also remote, container, cluster, multi-threaded, and multi-process debugging)	No	Yes	No	Yes	Yes	Yes	Yes	Yes	Yes	Yes	Yes

=== Obsolete ===
Python IDEs no longer in development

IDE	Developer	Latest stable release version	Latest stable release date	Platform	Written in	Widget toolkit	License	Python 2.x support	Python 3.x support	Debugger	GUI builder	Integrated toolchain	Profiler	Code coverage	Autocomplete	Static program analysis	GUI based design	Class browser	Code refactoring	Version control system support	Web framework support
IDLE	Guido van Rossum et al.	3.12.9	2025-02-04	Cross-platform	Python	Tkinter	PSFL	Yes	Yes	Yes	No	Unknown	No	No	Yes	No	Yes	Yes	Unknown	No	No
Komodo IDE	ActiveState	12.0.1	2020-11-09	Cross-platform	Unknown	Mozilla platform	Proprietary	Yes	Yes	Yes	Unknown	Unknown	Unknown	Unknown	Unknown	Unknown	Unknown	Unknown	Unknown	Bazaar, CVS, Git, Mercurial, Perforce, SVN	Unknown
Ninja-IDE	Team	2.4	2019-06-23	Cross-platform	Python	PyQt	GPL	Yes (Python 2.7)	Yes	Yes (with wdebugger plugin)	Unknown	Unknown	Unknown	Unknown	Unknown	Unknown	Unknown	Unknown	Unknown	Unknown	Unknown
Thonny	Aivar Annamaa	4.1.7	2024-12-16	Windows, Linux, macOS	Python	Unknown	MIT	No	Yes	Yes	No	Yes	No	No	Yes	No	Yes	Yes	No	No	No

== R ==
IDE	Developer	Latest stable release	Platform	License
Eclipse StatET (plug-in for Eclipse)	Stephan Wahlbrink	June 12, 2025, v4.11.0	Cross-platform	Apache License 2.0
R Tools for Visual Studio	Microsoft	March 10, 2017, v1.0 RC3	Microsoft Windows	Apache License 2.0
RStudio	RStudio, Inc.	October 29, 2018, v1.1.463	Cross-platform	AGPL

== Racket ==
IDE	Developer	Latest stable release	Platform	License
DrRacket	PLT Design, Inc.	26 October 2018, v7.1	Cross-platform	LGPL

== Ruby ==
IDE	Developer	Latest stable release	Platform	License
Aptana Studio with integrated RadRails plugin (Eclipse)	Aptana, Inc.	3.5.0 / December 27, 2013	Windows, Linux, macOS, FreeBSD, JVM, Solaris	GPL, proprietary
Eclipse DLTK Ruby Plugin	Eclipse Foundation	5.0.0 / June 6, 2013	x86	EPL
eric	Detlev Offenbach	6.1.4 / April 9, 2016	Cross-platform	GPLv3 "or later"
Komodo IDE / Edit	ActiveState	9.0.1 / April 19, 2015	Cross-platform	Proprietary
RubyMine (IntelliJ IDEA)	JetBrains	2018.3.5 (build 183.5912.16) / Feb 27, 2019	Windows, Linux, macOS, FreeBSD, OpenBSD, Solaris	Proprietary
SlickEdit	SlickEdit	October 2016	Windows, Linux, macOS, AIX, Solaris, HP-UX	Proprietary

== Rust ==
IDE	License	Windows	Linux	macOS	Debugger	Snippets	Code completion	Code Formatting
Atom	MIT License	Yes	Yes	Yes	No	Yes	Yes	Yes
BBEdit	Proprietary	No	No	Yes	No	Yes	No	Yes
CLion	Proprietary	Yes	Yes	Yes	Yes	Yes	Yes	Yes
Eclipse	Eclipse Public License	Yes	Yes	Yes	Yes	Yes	Yes	Yes
Kate	GNU General Public License	Yes	Yes	poor quality	No	Yes	Yes	Yes
RustRover	Proprietary	Yes	Yes	Yes	Yes	Yes	Yes	Yes
Sublime Text	Proprietary	Yes	Yes	Yes	No	Yes	Yes	Yes
Textadept	MIT License	Yes	Yes	Yes	No	Yes	Yes	No
Visual Studio Code	MIT License	Yes	Yes	Yes	Yes	Yes	Yes	Yes
Zed	AGPL, GPL, Apache License	Yes	Yes	Yes	Yes	Yes	Yes	Yes

== Scala ==
IDE	License	Windows	Linux	macOS	Other platforms
Eclipse JDT	EPL	Yes	Yes	Yes	FreeBSD, JVM, Solaris
IntelliJ IDEA	ASLv2, proprietary	Yes	Yes	Yes	FreeBSD, OpenBSD, Solaris
NetBeans	Apache License	Yes	Yes	Yes	Solaris

== Smalltalk ==
IDE	Developer	License	Windows	Linux	macOS	Other platforms	Debugger	GUI builder
Dolphin Smalltalk	Object Arts	MIT License	Yes	No	No	No	Yes	Yes
Pharo	INRIA	MIT License	Yes	Yes	Yes	various	Yes	Yes
Squeak	squeak.org	MIT License	Yes	Yes	Yes	various	Yes	Yes
VisualAge	IBM	Proprietary	Yes	Yes	Yes	various	Yes	Yes
VisualWorks	Cincom	Proprietary	Yes	Yes	Yes	various	Yes	Yes

== Tcl ==
IDE	Developer	Latest stable release	Platform	License
Eclipse DLTK		5.0	Windows, Linux, macOS, FreeBSD, JVM, Solaris	EPL
Komodo IDE / Edit	ActiveState	9.0.1	Cross-platform	IDE:Proprietary, Edit:GPL, LGPL, MPL
SlickEdit	SlickEdit	October 2016 v.21	Windows, Linux, macOS, AIX, Solaris, HP-UX	Proprietary

== Unclassified ==
- IBM Rational Business Developer
- Mule (software)

== Visual Basic .NET ==
IDE	Developer	License	Written in	First Release		Latest Stable Release		Windows	macOS	Linux
Microsoft Visual Studio	Microsoft	Proprietary	C++	2001		16.9.15	14 December 2021	Yes	Yes	No
Visual Studio Code	Microsoft	MIT	TypeScript	0.10.1	13 November 2015	1.70.2	15 August 2022	Yes	Yes	Yes

== See also ==
- Comparison of assemblers
- Comparison of compilers
- Graphical user interface builder
- List of integrated development environments
- Online integrated development environment
- Source-code editor
