= Scintilla (software) =

Free and open text editor component

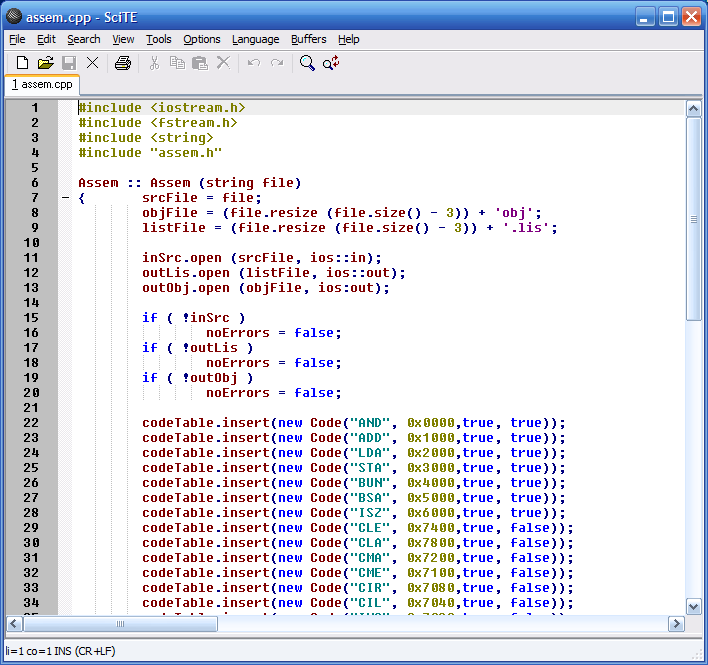
- Screenshot of SciTE, which uses the Scintilla component
- Developers: Neil Hodgson, et al.
- Initial release: 17 May 1999; 26 years ago
- Stable release: 5.5.8 (10 November 2025; 3 months ago) [±]
- Written in: C++
- Operating system: Windows NT and later, Mac OS 10.6 and later, Unix-like with GTK+, MorphOS
- Type: Text editor
- License: Historical Permission Notice and Disclaimer
- Website: scintilla.org
- Repository: sf.net/p/scintilla/code/

Scintilla is a free, open-source library that provides a text editing component function, with an emphasis on advanced features for source code editing.

== Features ==
Scintilla supports many features to make code editing easier in addition to syntax highlighting. The highlighting method allows the use of different fonts, colors, styles and background colors, and is not limited to fixed-width fonts. The control supports error indicators, line numbering in the margin, as well as line markers such as code breakpoints. Other features such as code folding and autocompletion can be added. The basic regular expression search implementation is rudimentary, but if compiled with C++11 support Scintilla can support the runtime's regular expression engine. Scintilla's regular expression library can also be replaced or avoided with direct buffer access.

Currently, Scintilla has experimental support for right-to-left languages.

Scinterm is a version of Scintilla for the curses text user interface. It is written by the developer of the Textadept editor. Scinterm uses Unicode characters to support some of Scintilla's graphically oriented features, but some Scintilla features are missing because of the terminal environment's constraints.

== Other versions ==
- ScintillaNET – a wrapper for use on the .NET Framework
- QScintilla – Qt port of Scintilla
- wxScintilla – wxWidgets wrapper for Scintilla
- wxStyledTextCtrl – class acting as a wrapper for Scintilla in the wxWidgets toolkit
- CsScintilla – CopperSpice port of Scintilla
- Delphi wrappers:
  - TScintEdit – part of Inno Setup
  - TDScintilla – simple wrapper for all methods of Scintilla
  - TScintilla – one of the components in the Delphi Scintilla Interface Components (as of 2009-09-02, this project is no longer under active development)

== Software based on Scintilla ==
Notable software based on Scintilla includes:

- Aegisub
- Altova XMLSpy
- Ch
- Code::Blocks
- CodeLite
- ConTEXT
- Eric Python IDE
- FlashDevelop
- Geany
- gPHPedit
- IDEal
- Inno Setup Compiler IDE (as of 5.4)
- Keil μVision IDE
- Komodo
- MySQL Workbench
- Notepad++
- Notepad2
- Notepad3
- Notepad4
- Perl Application Development and Refactoring Environment (Padre)
- PureBasic
- SciTE
- TextAdept
- Uniface
- ZeroBrane Studio IDE
