= ORX =

Open-source game engine

- Developer: orx-project.org
- Stable release: 1.17 / April 27, 2026; 5 months ago
- Written in: C, C++
- Platform: Cross-platform
- Type: Game engine
- License: zlib license
- Website: orx-project.org
- Repository: github.com/orx/orx

Orx is an open-source, portable, plug-in-based, data-driven 2D-oriented game engine written in C.

It runs on Windows (MinGW and Visual Studio versions), Linux, MacOS, iOS and Android.

== General information ==
Orx provides a game creation framework including a 3D scene graph, hardware accelerated 2D rendering, animation, input, sound and physics. It is designed for game prototyping and development.

Orx is published under the Zlib license.

== History ==
ORX's development began in July 2002, reusing code written by Roman Killian, but was abandoned. The project was picked up again in 2007.

== Version history ==
In 2009, ORX version 1.0rc0 was released. This version of ORX added support for Mac OS X (x86) as well as the support for Win32 and Linux (x86). Generic input system like keyboard, mouse and joystick input and fragment shader support were introduced.

ORX version 1.2 was released in 2010. It came with bugs fixes and optimizations. The major update was the support for iOS and Unicode.

ORX version 1.3rc0 was introduced in 2011. It came out with a bunch of new features like joint support, variable width fonts, OpenGL 2.0 and others. Previous issues and bugs were also resolved. This was the first time when Android support was also added to the engine.

ORX version 1.4cr0 was introduced in 2012. Some new features were added to ORX in this update like Interactive console, commands, textured mesh rendering, geometry rendering and previously known issues were fixed.

ORX version 1.11 was released in May 2020 with support changes for MinGW-w64, including new support for 64bit, OSX/Retina and Windows high DPI display, control over polled physical peripherals, text animations and more.

ORX version 1.12 was released in May 2021, with performance and scalability changes, a rewrite of the orxBANK module, support for joysticks on Android-Native, changes to the Android build pipeline and Nuklear support for new projects.

ORX version 1.13 was released in March 2022, with new features, including a new SoundSystem plugin based on MiniAudio (OGG, WAV & MP3 files), support for config-driven filters for both sounds and buses, multiple sound listeners, sound panning, sound spatialization, Support for the QOI image format, native arm64 and with support for MacOS 11/XCode 12.x.

ORX version 1.14 was released in June 2023, with 50+ updates or new features, including a revamp of Android integration using (GameActivity, Swappy, Paddleboat).

ORX version 1.15 was released in August 2024, with more than 40 updates or new features, including a new mem resource type for embedded resources, a revised FX module with support for Bezier and 30 web easing curves, and a new Trigger module for handling hierarchical events like physics collisions and object lifetimes. It also adds headless mode, runtime Inspector and Cheat extensions, support for Atari ST audio files via SNDH, and updated .Mod extension for .XM and .S3M audio formats.

ORX version 1.16 was released in June 2025, with 48+ updates or new features, including the Web/HTML5 platform support, runtime TrueType/OpenType font support, SDF fonts are supported (either generated offline or at runtime). Support for QOA (audio) and PNM, GIF & PSD (bitmap) formats is added. Plugins are now handled as resources.

ORX version 1.17 was released in April 2026, with 25+ updates or new features, including named variables for commands or ScrollObject auto-binding, Locale groups that can now be overridden for any graphics, texts or sounds, several new triggers, a new init extension based on the Clay library (GUI/layout). The release also added a task worker pool that scales with the underlying hardware.

== Features ==
Orx is written in C and has an object oriented design with a plugin architecture. This allows its kernel to be cross-platform and delegates hardware- and OS-dependent tasks to plugins. Most of these plugins are based on other open-source libraries, such as GLFW, SDL and Box2D (LiquidFun fork).

Build files are provided for GCC makefiles, Visual Studio (2017, 2019 & 2022), Codelite, Code::Blocks and Xcode.

Orx contains

- automated sprite rendering using 3D hardware acceleration allowing: translations, anisotropic scale, rotation, transparency (alpha blending), coloring (multiply, add and subtract blends), tiling and mirroring
- resource management
- multiple render targets (MRT) and compositing support
- geometric display primitives and textured mesh rendering
- camera/viewport system allowing multiple views on one screen with camera translations, zooms and rotations
- 3D scene graph used for object positioning, allowing grouped translations, rotations and scales
- sound and music with volume, pitch and loop control, spatialization, hierarchical buses, filters, recording, etc.
- 2D physics engine (LiquidFun - fork of Box2D)
- collision detection and rigid body physics and joints
- animation system
- event management
- custom fragment (pixel) shader support
- unicode support
- custom bitmap font rendering
- real time CPU profiler
- interactive "debug" console
- multi-monitor support
- clipboard support

It also provides

- data-driven object creation controlled through configuration files
- automatic resource hotloading at runtime when files are modified on disk during development
- a clock system, allowing the user to keep time consistency, having the ability of doing local or global time stretching
- an animation chaining graph: animation transitions are defined in a graph, this allows the code to request only the final target animation; all transitions will be automated depending on the starting animation
- a custom animation event system, which allows synchronization with parts of animations
- a visual FX system: config-based combination of curves of sine, sawtooth and linear shapes that can be plugged on object properties: color, alpha, position, translation or rotation
- a resource system that abstracts resource access and work with separated development files as well as packed ones for release builds, or even use different sets of resources on different platforms, without having to change a line of code
- an automated differential scrolling with depth scaling and differential scrolling controlled through config files, allowing differential parallax scrolling on any number of planes
- a configuration system, featuring inheritance, direct random control, encryption/decryption, filtered save and history reload. This allows settings to be adjusted through configuration files
- a spawning system, allowing the user to create weapon bullets or, combined with the visual FX system, visual effects
- a UI object positioning system that supports different aspect ratios and provides a picking and selection framework
- a generic input system: allows users to use any kind of controllers (mouse, joystick, keyboard, touch, accelerometer, ...) through an abstract layer. The user asks for input status using plain names, bindings being done in config files or on the fly for user input customization, for example
- scripting via a combination of timelines and commands
- multi-threading support with asynchronous resources loading and hotloading support

== See also ==
- SFML
- SDL
- Box2D
- GP2X
- Codelite
