= TDM-GCC =

Compiler suite for Microsoft Windows

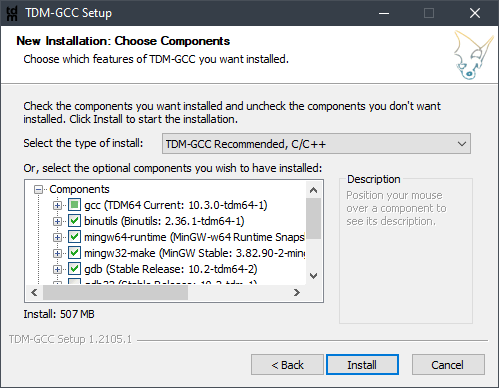
- TDM-GCC Setup Assistant displaying a list of available GNU compilers
- Original author: John E.
- Stable release: 10.3.0 / May 24, 2021; 4 years ago
- Repository: github.com/jmeubank/tdm-gcc
- Written in: C++
- Platform: Microsoft Windows
- Type: Compiler
- License: CC0
- Website: jmeubank.github.io/tdm-gcc/

TDM-GCC is a compiler suite for Microsoft Windows.

It combines the most recent stable release of the GCC toolset, a few patches for Windows-friendliness, and the free and open-source MinGW runtime APIs to create an open-source alternative to Microsoft's compiler and platform SDK. It is able to build 32-bit or 64-bit binaries, for any version of Windows since Windows 98.

TDM-GCC is a redistribution of components that are freely available elsewhere. A large difference is that it changes the default GCC libraries to be statically linked, and use a shared memory region for exception handling.

As of October 2025, Development seems to have ceased since 2021.

== IDEs that come bundled with TDM-GCC ==
- Code::Blocks
- Dev-C++

== See also ==
- Mingw-w64
