= List of source code editors for Erlang =

Erlang is an open source programming language. Multiple development environments (including IDEs and source code editors with plug-ins adding IDE features) have support for Erlang.

== Integrated Development Environments (IDEs) ==
=== Syntax, parsing, code-assist ===
IDE	Syntax coloring	Live parsing, error checking	Code indentation	Code reformatting	Code outline	Code folding	Code completion	Static code analysis (Dialyzer)
GNU Emacs	Yes	EDTS plug-in	Yes	No			EDTS plug-in	EDTS plug-in
Vim	Yes	vim-erlang-compiler plug-in	Yes	No	Tag List plug-in	Yes	vim-erlang-omnicomplete plug-in	ALE plug-in
Eclipse	erlide plug-in	erlide plug-in	erlide plug-in	No	erlide plug-in	erlide plug-in	erlide plug-in	erlide plug-in
IntelliJ IDEA	intellij-erlang plug-in	intellij-erlang plug-in	intellij-erlang plug-in	intellij-erlang plug-in	intellij-erlang plug-in	intellij-erlang plug-in	intellij-erlang plug-in	intellij-erlang plug-in
Sublime Text version 2	Yes	No	Non-standard	No		Yes	No	No
Sublime Text version 3	Yes	No	Non-standard	No		Yes	Erl-AutoCompletion plug-in	No
Atom	atom-language-erlang plug-in	No	Non-standard	No		atom-language-erlang plug-in	No	No
Visual Studio Code	vscode_erlang plug-in	vscode_erlang plug-in	Non-standard	No		vscode_erlang plug-in	No	No

=== Goto, searching ===
IDE	Go to declaration	Show definition/information	Find usages/references
GNU Emacs	EDTS plug-in	EDTS plug-in	EDTS plug-in
Vim	vim-erlang-tags plug-in	No	No
Eclipse	erlide plug-in	erlide plug-in	erlide plug-in
IntelliJ IDEA	intellij-erlang plug-in	intellij-erlang plug-in	intellij-erlang plug-in
Sublime Text version 2		No	No
Sublime Text version 3	Erl-AutoCompletion	No	No
Atom		No	No
Visual Studio Code		No	No

=== Code generation ===
IDE	Code snippets	Module skeletons
GNU Emacs	Yes	Yes
Vim	vim-snippets plug-in	vim-erlang-skeletons plug-in
Eclipse	No	erlide plug-in
IntelliJ IDEA	intellij-erlang plug-in	intellij-erlang plug-in
Sublime Text version 2	No	No
Sublime Text version 3	No	No
Atom	atom-language-erlang plug-in	No
Visual Studio Code	erlang-vscode plug-in	No

=== Build, debug, run ===
IDE	Run build	Run EUnit tests	Run Common Test tests	Debugger	Hot code loading
GNU Emacs	No	EDTS plug-in	No	Distel plug-in	EDTS plug-in
Vim				No	vim-erlang-compiler plug-in
Eclipse	erlide plug-in	erlide plug-in	No	erlide plug-in	erlide plug-in
IntelliJ IDEA	intellij-erlang plug-in	intellij-erlang plug-in	intellij-erlang plug-in	intellij-erlang plug-in	No
Sublime Text version 2	No	No	No	No	No
Sublime Text version 3	No	No	No	No	No
Atom	No	No	No	atom-language-erlang plug-in	No
Visual Studio Code	No	vscode_erlang plug-in	No	vscode_erlang plug-in	No
