= GNU Pascal =

Compiler for the Pascal programming language

- GNU Pascal logo
- Original authors: Jukka Virtanen, Peter Gerwinski, Frank Heckenbach, Waldek Hebisch
- Release: Provides no regular releases.
- Final release: 2.1 / 4 September 2007; 19 years ago
- Written in: C (compiler), C and Pascal (runtime)
- Operating system: Cross-platform
- Type: Compiler
- License: GPL
- Website: www.gnu-pascal.de
- Repository: github.com/hebisch/gpc

GNU Pascal (GPC) is a Pascal compiler composed of a frontend to GNU Compiler Collection (GCC), similar to the way Fortran and other languages were added to GCC. GNU Pascal is ISO 7185 compatible, and it implements most of the ISO 10206 Extended Pascal standard.

The major advantage of piggybacking GNU Pascal on the GCC compiler is that it is instantly portable to any platform the GCC compiler supports. However, since GPC is an out of tree frontend, it does have to adapt if major changes are done to GCC (like a major new version). Typically, new major versions are adopted only slowly (still mostly at 3.x, with 4.x experimental builds). This is probably one of the reasons why developers are looking at a C targeting backend.

In July 2010 a developer publicly asked opinion (it vanished from the web between July 2014 and June 2015) on the future of GNU Pascal, due to developer shortage and maintenance issues as a GCC port. There was a lively discussion on the maillist where the developers seemed to lean towards reimplementing in C++ with a C code generating backend. The maillist went to sleep again, and as of September 2025 no further releases or announcements about the future course of the project have been made. The last mailing list message of any kind was in 2021.

Dev-Pascal is a graphical IDE that supports GNU Pascal.

== See also ==
- Free Pascal
- Lazarus (software)
