= IDLE =

Integrated development environment for Python

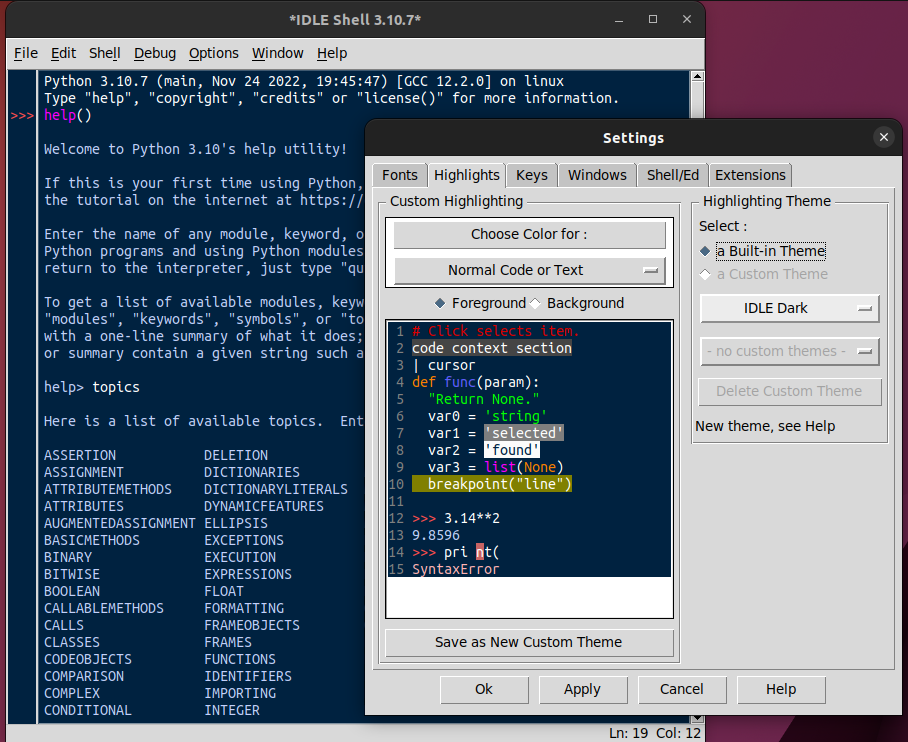
- IDLE in action under Ubuntu: shell with highlights settings
- Original author: Guido van Rossum
- Release: December 22, 1998; 27 years ago
- Stable release: 3.12.9 / 4 February 2025; 21 months ago
- Written in: Python
- Type: Integrated development environment
- Website: docs.python.org/library/idle.html
- Repository: github.com/python/cpython/tree/master/Lib/idlelib

IDLE (short for Integrated Development and Learning Environment) is an integrated development environment for Python, which has been bundled with the default implementation of the language since 1.5.2b1. It is packaged as an optional part of the Python packaging with many Linux distributions. It is completely written in Python and the Tkinter GUI toolkit (wrapper functions for Tcl/Tk).

IDLE is intended to be a simple IDE and suitable for beginners, especially in an educational environment. To that end, it is cross-platform, and avoids feature clutter.

According to the included README and the online IDLE documentation, its main features are:

- Multi-window text editor with syntax highlighting, autocompletion, smart indent and other features.
- Python shell with syntax highlighting.
- Integrated debugger with stepping, persistent breakpoints, and call stack visibility.

Author Guido van Rossum says IDLE stands for "Integrated Development and Learning Environment", and since Van Rossum named the language Python after the British comedy group Monty Python, the name IDLE was probably also chosen partly to honor Eric Idle, one of Monty Python's founding members.

== See also ==
- List of integrated development environments for Python
- List of integrated development environments
