= Dev-C++ =

Free C++ development environment

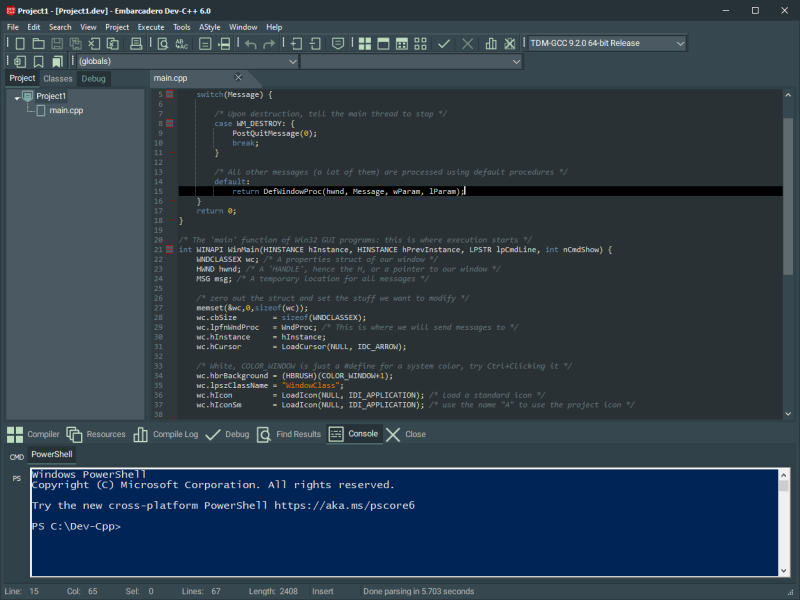
- Dev-C++ showing its updated UI and new variable browsing options
- Original author: Colin Laplace (Bloodshed Software) 1998-2005
- Developer: Johan Mes (Orwell) 2011-2020, Embarcadero since 2020
- Release: 1998; 28 years ago
- Stable release: 6.3 / January 30, 2021; 5 years ago
- Written in: Delphi
- Operating system: Microsoft Windows
- Type: Integrated development environment
- License: GPL-2.0-or-later
- Website: Current (Embarcadero); Previous (Orwell); Previous (wxDev-C++); Original (Bloodshed)
- Repository: github.com/Embarcadero/Dev-Cpp

Dev-C++ is a free full-featured integrated development environment (IDE) distributed under the GNU General Public License for programming in C and C++. It was originally developed by Colin Laplace and was first released in 1998. It is written in Delphi.

It is bundled with, and uses, the MinGW or TDM-GCC 64bit port of the GCC as its compiler. Dev-C++ can also be used in combination with Cygwin or any other GCC-based compiler.

== DevPaks ==
An additional aspect of Dev-C++ is its use of DevPaks: packaged extensions on the programming environment with additional libraries, templates, and utilities. DevPaks often contain, but are not limited to, GUI utilities, including popular toolkits such as GTK+, wxWidgets, and FLTK. Other DevPaks include libraries for more advanced function use. Users of Dev-C++ can download additional libraries, or packages of code that increase the scope and functionality of Dev-C++, such as graphics, compression, animation, sound support and many more. Users can create DevPaks and host them for free on the site. Also, they are not limited to use with Dev-C++ - the site says "A typical devpak will work with any MinGW distribution (with any IDE for MinGW)".

== Development status ==
From February 22, 2005 the project was not noticeably active, with no news posted nor any updated versions released. In a 2006 forum post, lead developer Colin Laplace stated that he was busy with real-life issues and did not have time to continue the development of Dev-C++.

There are three forks of Dev-C++ since then: wxDev-C++, the Orwell version, and the Embarcadero-maintained fork version.

=== wxDev-C++ version ===
wxDev-C++ is a development team that has taken Dev-C++ and added new features such as support for multiple compilers and a RAD designer for wxWidgets applications.

=== Orwell version ===
On June 30, 2011 an unofficial version 4.9.9.3 of Dev-C++ was released by Orwell (Johan Mes), an independent programmer, featuring the more recent GCC 4.5.2 compiler, Windows' SDK resources (Win32 and D3D), numerous bugfixes, and improved stability. On August 27, after five years of officially being in the beta stage, version 5.0 was released. This version also has its own separate SourceForge page since version 5.0.0.5, because the old developer is not responding to combining requests. In July 2014, Orwell Dev-C++ 5.7.1 was released featuring the then-recent GCC 4.8.1 which supports C++11. In a 2020 forum post, Orwell lead developer Johan Mes stated that he "will probably still not have any time to work on this project".

=== Embarcadero version ===
On July 1, 2020 a new fork version 5.50 of Dev-C++ was sponsored and released by Embarcadero featuring a code upgrade to Delphi 10.4. On October 12, 2020 a new fork version 6.0 of Dev-C++ was sponsored and released by Embarcadero with a more recent GCC 9.2.0 compiler with C++11 and partial C++20 support, new high DPI support, UTF8 file support, upgraded icons, dark theme, and additional changes.

== Notable uses ==
On May 4, 2015, the Singaporean Prime Minister Lee Hsien Loong posted his Sudoku solver program in C++ on Facebook. In his screenshot, he's using Microsoft Windows and Dev-C++ as his IDE.

It is often recommended for beginners learning C or C++, and is available on Wine. It is compared with Turbo C++ or other IDEs.

== See also ==
- Code::Blocks
- CodeLite
- TheIDE
- Mingw-w64
- Comparison of integrated development environments
- List of integrated development environments
