= PHPEclipse =

- Original author: Various
- Developer: sourceforge hosted project
- Stable release: 1.2.3 / October 9, 2009
- Preview release: Nightly update / rolling
- Operating system: Cross-platform
- Type: IDE
- License: Eclipse Public License
- Website: http://www.phpeclipse.com/

PHPEclipse is a PHP development plugin for the Eclipse IDE Framework.

== Features ==
- PHP parser
- Debugger
- Code formatter
- Outline view
- Templates

Being built on the Eclipse framework, there is a raft of additional features provided directly by Eclipse.

== History ==
The PHPEclipse project was started in November 2002 as an open source add-on to the eclipse framework to provide PHP tools and highlighting. It is a popular package. As development has continued over the years by a dedicated group of open-source developers, new features have been added to the project and several issues have been resolved.

In late September 2009 a major overhaul had been started on the PHPEclipse code base to add in more features and fix many long outstanding issues. This may be the 2.0.0 release of PHPEclipse but for now the developers are calling it 1.3.x. The current 1.2.x release will get code from 1.3.x if possible to continue to improve PHPEclipse for users until 1.3.x or 2.0.x is released.

As of Sat Apr 08 2006 there have been 419,004 downloads recorded on the SourceForge site for the 1.1.8 packaged release. However, with online updates and its inclusion as standard in many of the standard Linux distributions that include Eclipse and the 4 newer releases of PHPEclipse, the actual number of users is difficult to estimate. PHPEclipse retains its open source base and has an active presence on SourceForge.

== See also ==
- Comparison of integrated development environments - PHP section
