= Dev-Pascal =

- Developer: Bloodshed Software
- Stable release: 1.9.2
- Written in: Delphi
- Operating system: Microsoft Windows
- Type: Integrated development environment
- License: GNU General Public License
- Website: dev-cpp.com/Dev-Pascal/

Dev-Pascal is a free integrated development environment (IDE) distributed under the GNU General Public License for programming in Pascal and Object Pascal. It supports an ancient version of the Free Pascal compiler and GNU Pascal as backends. The IDE is written in Delphi. It can also handle the Insight Debugger. Dev-Pascal runs on Microsoft Windows.

== See also ==
- Lazarus (IDE)
- Dev-C++
- Comparison of integrated development environments
