= Simply Fortran =

Integrated Development Environment

- Developer(s): Approximatrix, LLC
- Initial release: July 23, 2010; 14 years ago
- Stable release: 3.40 / March 26, 2025; 53 days ago
- Operating system: Windows, Linux, macOS
- Available in: English
- Type: IDE
- License: Proprietary
- Website: simplyfortran.com

Simply Fortran is an Integrated Development Environment (IDE) for GNU Fortran (which currently implements FORTRAN 77, Fortran 90, Fortran 95, Fortran 2003 and Fortran 2008). The project is maintained by the company Approximatrix, LLC.

== See also ==
- Comparison of integrated development environments
- KDevelop
