= CodeLite =

Integrated development environment

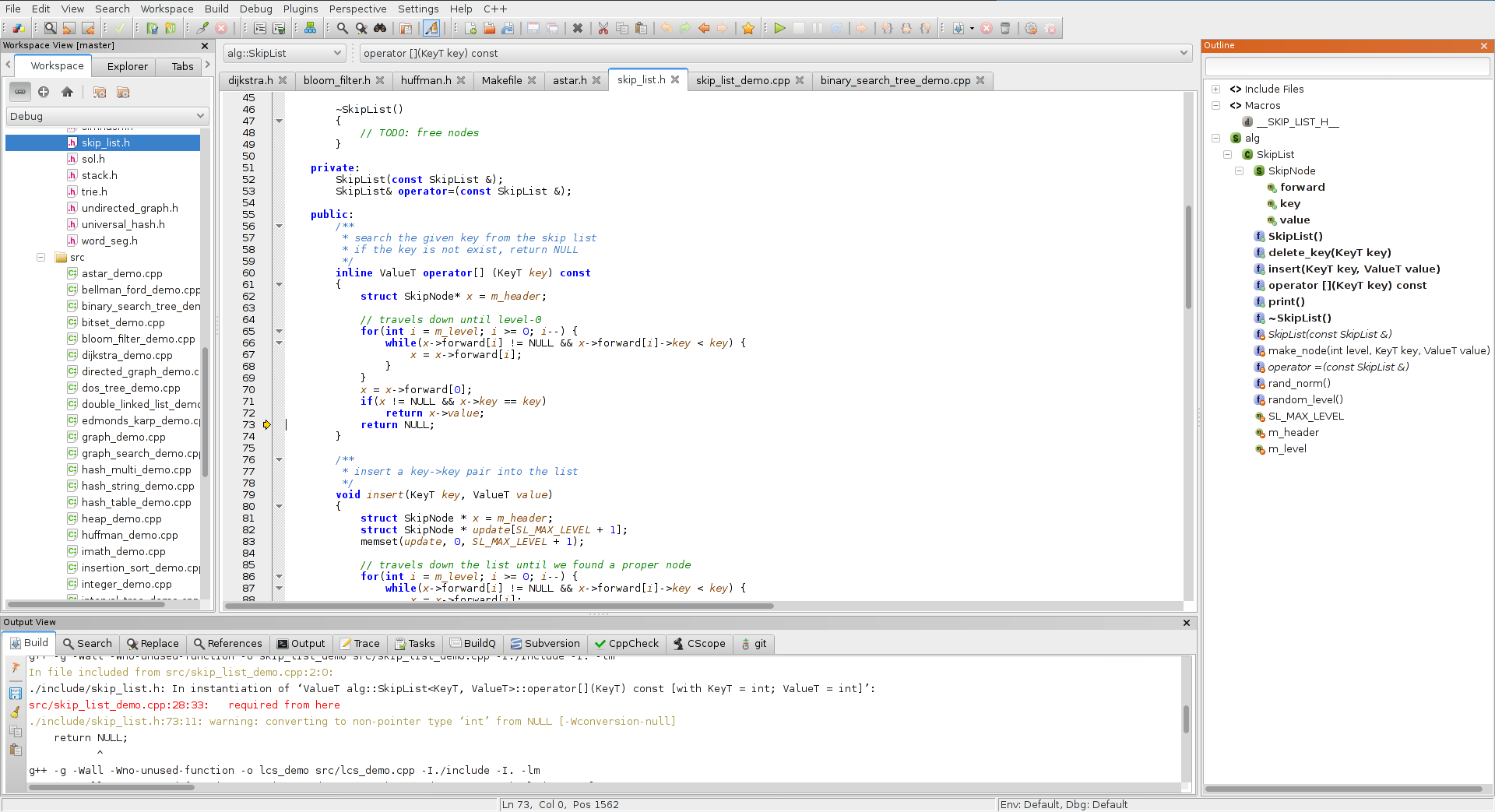
- A screenshot of the open-source CodeLite C/C++ IDE
- Developer: Eran Ifrah
- Stable release: 18.4.0 / 13 June 2026; 2 months ago
- Written in: C++
- Operating system: Windows, macOS, Linux
- Platform: IA-32, x64
- Type: IDE
- License: GPL-2.0-or-later (Note: With an exception for plugins.)
- Website: codelite.org
- Repository: github.com/eranif/codelite

CodeLite is a free and open-source IDE for the C, C++, PHP, and JavaScript (Node.js) programming languages.

== History ==
In August 2006, Eran Ifrah started an autocomplete project named CodeLite. The idea was to create a code completion library based on ctags, SQLite (hence, CodeLite), and a Yacc based parser that could be used by other IDEs. Later Clang became an optional parser for code completion, greatly improving its functionality.

LiteEditor, a demo application, was developed for demonstrating CodeLite's functionalities. Eventually, LiteEditor evolved into the CodeLite IDE.

== General ==
CodeLite is a free, open-source, cross-platform IDE for the C/C++ programming languages using the wxWidgets toolkit. To comply with CodeLite's open-source spirit, the program itself is compiled and debugged using only free tools (MinGW and GDB) for Mac OS X, Windows, Linux and FreeBSD, though CodeLite can execute any third-party compiler or tool that has a command-line interface. CodeLite also supports PHP and JavaScript development (including Node.js support).

CodeLite features project management (workspace/projects), code completion, code refactoring, source browsing, syntax highlighting, Subversion integration, cscope integration, UnitTest++ integration, an interactive debugger built over gdb and a source code editor (based on Scintilla).

CodeLite is distributed under the GNU General Public License v2 or Later. It is being developed and debugged using itself as the development platform with daily updates available through its Git repository.

== See also ==
- Comparison of integrated development environments
- SciTE
- wxWidgets
- Code::Blocks
- Geany
