= Sense (programming) =

- Paradigm: object-oriented, educational, event-driven
- Designed by: The Open University
- Developer: The Open University
- First appeared: 2008; 18 years ago
- Stable release: Build 136
- Typing discipline: Dynamic
- Implementation language: Squeak
- OS: Windows, OS X, Linux
- Filename extensions: .sb
- Website: sense.open.ac.uk

Major implementations
- Scratch

Influenced by
- Scratch

Sense is an educational programming environment created by The Open University (OU) in the United Kingdom. It uses a drag-and-drop programming environment designed to teach students the fundamentals of computer programming, using different shape and colour "blocks" selected from a palette of available commands, meaning that the student needs no prior experience of programming nor need to learn a syntax. It is based on the Scratch programming language developed by the MIT Media Lab, and uses .sb files like Scratch but the two pieces of software cannot use each other's files.

The Sense programming environment is designed to work in conjunction with the SenseBoard, a specialised piece of hardware which connects to a user's computer via a USB connection. The SenseBoard has different input types such as sensors for infrared, light, sound (microphone), and temperature (thermometer), and outputs such as a motor and light emitting diodes (LEDs).

Sense and the SenseBoard are primarily used as part of the OU's My Digital Life (TU100) module, but is also used to a lesser degree on other modules. Sense was trialed in London schools in late 2012.
