= HiAsm =

Integrated development environment

- Developer: Dilma (Dmitriy Vlasov)
- Stable release: 4.05 build 186 / September 27, 2015; 10 years ago
- Written in: Delphi
- Operating system: Windows
- Size: 16.1 MB
- Type: IDE
- License: Freeware
- Website: www.hiasm.com

HiAsm (Hight Assembler) (Russian: Хай-асм) is a free application integrated development environment (IDE) for Windows API (Win32), Qt, wxWidgets, scripts and pages in PHP, HTML, and JavaScript, in addition to applications for devices based on Windows Mobile, such as the Pocket PC PDA.

HiAsm is a practical example of the implementation of the approach model-driven architecture, also known as "the development of the model". The significance of this approach is abstracted from the platforms, architectures, hardware vendors, and system software.

When designing, users need no knowledge of programming languages and operating system features, thus allowing users to create applications by controlling their model using an intuitive graphical interface.

== Packages ==
HiAsm has supplementary packages you can use for certain kinds of applications.

=== Delphi and FPC ===
The basic package that comes with the environment allows people to develop small Windows applications using the components of the Internet, databases, graphics (GDI and OpenGL), extensive multimedia capabilities including sound, background programs, applets, control panels, libraries (DLL files), etc.

=== Pocket PC ===
Like the prior package, this allows users to develop applications, but this time it is under Windows CE for Pocket PC PDAs and some smartphones. The package is structured so that the scheme, collected under the Pocket PC, needs virtually no change to be ported to Delphi and FPC and vice versa, thus reducing the time to develop programs, and to port them to other platforms.

=== Web ===
As the name implies, this package allows users to develop applications for a web server using PHP, client-side JavaScript, and HTML. A distinctive feature of this package is that the generated code for the compiled pattern is almost equal in quality to what a developer could write by hand. Due to this, the package can also be used to automatically generate template web applications with subsequent manual editing.

=== FASM ===
Most of the package serves as an example and demonstration of the capabilities of HiAsm. Therefore, it will most likely only interest programmers who wish to develop their own packages. It allows writing Windows API applications in pure assembly (flat assembler, FASM) using the components of the code insertion and links between them.

=== Qt ===
Packages based on Qt allow users to develop cross-platform applications. HiAsm can be run on Linux only through Wine.

Hiasm 5.0 is on the road (you can install it on Ubuntu) which working on Linux also and will include gcc etc.

=== WxWidgets ===
Packages can be based on wxWidgets, and Qt. Users can use them to create cross-platform applications.

== HiAsm 5 ==
Now the development of the fifth version of the environment is stopped. However, the HiAsm.NET project is a continuation of it. HiAsm.NET was originally made using a large amount of HiAsm 5 source code. From a certain point, it was supplemented with original code that was not in HiAsm 5 or was not appropriate to transfer. Therefore, do not combine these two projects.
