= HyperEdit =

Mac OS X application for editing HTML

Whisk

- HyperEdit running on Mac OS X 10.4 Tiger.
- Developers: Jonathan Deutsch, Tumult Co.
- Release: July 23, 2003; 22 years ago
- Stable release: 2.6.1 / October 25, 2022
- Written in: Objective-C
- Operating system: macOS
- Type: HTML editor
- License: Shareware
- Website: tumult.com/whisk/

Tumult Whisk (originally Tumult HyperEdit) is an application for Apple's Mac OS X developed by Jonathan Deutsch.

== Development ==
In 2003, while studying computer science at Indiana's Purdue University, Jonathan Deutsch wrote HyperEdit to create a live HTML editor that would remove the need to save an HTML file and reload it in a browser to test each change. French news site MacGeneration said live preview was a novel idea in 2003. HypedEdit's live preview was built on Apple's newly released open-source WebKit web rendering engine. It was initially released as donationware.

HyperEdit was renamed to Whisk with the release of version 2.0. Whisk was released as shareware with a free trial, and some of its code was taken from Deutsch's "Hype" web animation application.

== Features ==
The software is primarily targeted at web developers, combining a HTML (including CSS), PHP and JavaScript editor in one lightweight program. It offers customizable syntax highlighting for these web languages.

Its features include W3C validation (which underlines mistakes in red), a JavaScript debugger, code snippets, and a real-time preview in the application's right pane.

== Reception ==
Macworld's Robert Ellis rated HyperEdit 4.5 mice out of 5, praising its live previewing and describing it as a lower-cost, less-bloated alternative to Adobe GoLive or Macromedia Dreamweaver. Charles Arthur also praised it in The Independent and The Guardian, saying that its live preview turned a normally "miserable task" into something "interactive, fun, and much quicker". By 2004, Tucows rated it as the second-best HTML editor, ahead of Dreamweaver.
