= ZeroBrane Studio =

Open-source IDE for the Lua programming language

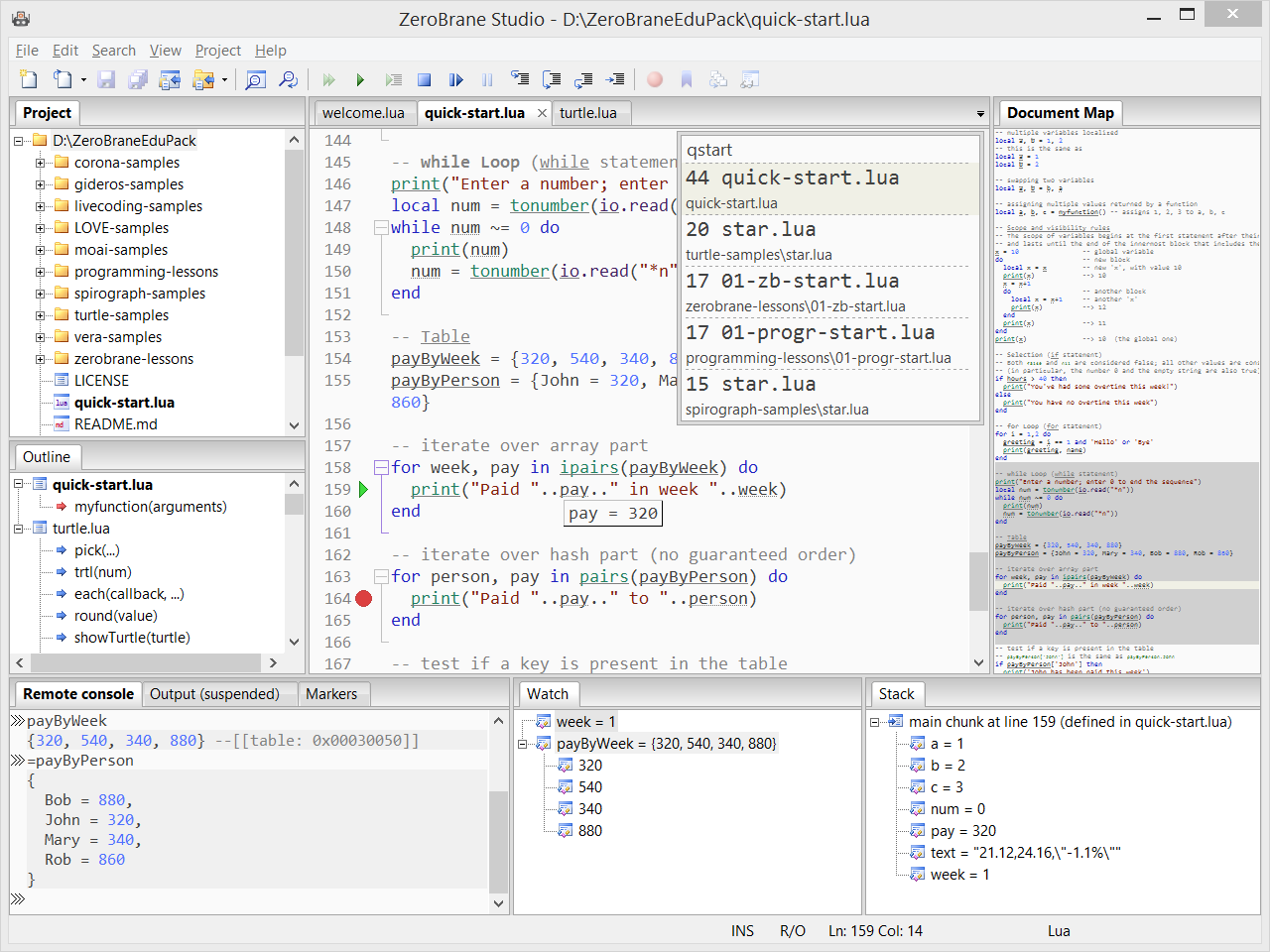
- ZeroBrane Studio
- Original author: Paul Kulchenko
- Initial release: January 18, 2012; 14 years ago
- Stable release: 2.01 / September 26, 2023; 2 years ago
- Written in: Lua (using the wxWidgets toolkit)
- Operating system: Cross-Platform
- Type: IDE
- License: MIT License
- Website: studio.zerobrane.com
- Repository: github.com/pkulchenko/ZeroBraneStudio

ZeroBrane Studio is a lightweight open-source Lua IDE with code completion, syntax highlighting, code analyzer, live coding, and debugging support for Lua 5.1, Lua 5.2, Lua 5.3, Lua 5.4, LuaJIT, and other Lua engines. ZeroBrane Studio is a cross-platform application written in Lua that runs on Windows (Windows XP+), Linux, and macOS (10.9+) operating systems. It uses the wxWidgets toolkit and the Scintilla component for file editing.

== History ==
ZeroBrane Studio was created by Paul Kulchenko in September 2011 as a way to allow inexperienced users to run and debug Lua applications, initially targeting Lua applications running on mobile devices. It was based on open-source Estrela Editor for Luxinia, an open-source 3D graphics engine. Estrela Editor was developed starting from August 2008 based on one of the sample applications included with wxLua wrapper around wxWidgets.

The first public version of ZeroBrane Studio was released in January 2012. During the first year of the project, the development of Estrela and ZeroBrane Studio continued in parallel and in October 2012 Estrela Editor project was fully merged into ZeroBrane Studio project.

== Features ==
- Auto-completion
- Multiple document support
- Syntax highlighting
- Code folding
- Brace and indent highlighting
- Bookmarks
- Project support
- Debugging, including remote and cross-platform debugging
- Interactive console to directly test code snippets with local and remote execution
- Static analyzer
- Customizable shortcut key mapping
- Function list
- Fuzzy search with navigation to files, lines, and symbols/functions
- Markdown formatting in comments
- Dark mode and color scheme support
- Extensive documentation and tutorials
- Integration with LuaDist package manager

== Interpreter integration ==
ZeroBrane Studio provides integration and debugging support for Lua 5.1, Lua 5.2, Lua 5.3, Lua 5.4, and LuaJIT interpreters integrated into various products: CoronaSDK, Cocos2d, Moai SDK, LÖVE, Gideros, Redis, Torch, Adobe Lightroom, Nginx Lua scripts and more.

There are several books and tutorials that cover using ZeroBrane Studio with various game and mobile toolkits. It has also been used in teaching undergraduate and graduate class on mobile application development.

== Debugging ==
ZeroBrane Studio provides local, remote and cross-platform debugging for applications executing Lua code. The debugger supports the following functions: step through the code, set/remove breakpoints, inspect variables and expressions using the Watch window, inspect the call stack with local values and upvalues (local values defined in the outer scope of the current function) using the Stack window, suspend/resume the running application, and run Lua commands in the Console window.

The IDE also supports on-device debugging for Corona SDK and Gideros Mobile software development kits, with the application running on a mobile device and the IDE running on a desktop computer.

== Live coding ==
In addition to debugging Lua applications, ZeroBrane Studio also supports live coding, which allows making changes to the application code while the application is running and seeing the results of the changes in the application. The live coding is supported for Lua interpreters and several other environments.

== Plugins ==
ZeroBrane Studio includes support for plugins written in Lua. The open source plugin repository currently lists 45 plugins that range from simple plugins that customize the environment to more complex ones that provide real-time watches, document map, or split screen editing.

== Integrated educational materials ==
Packaged versions of ZeroBrane Studio distributed from the project website include educational materials for Lua with more than 50 simple scripts and examples, demonstrating use of Lua with Turtle graphics and Spirograph scripts. ZeroBrane Studio supports Markdown formatting in comments, which supports text formatting and references to other Lua files and external resources. It supports execution of Lua commands directly in the IDE, providing integration with included educational materials.

== Interface translations ==
ZeroBrane Studio supports interface translation into different languages by providing a Lua file containing all text that should be translated. As of 2020, the user community has contributed translations to eleven languages.

== See also ==
- List of integrated development environments
