= Geany =

Integrated Development Environment

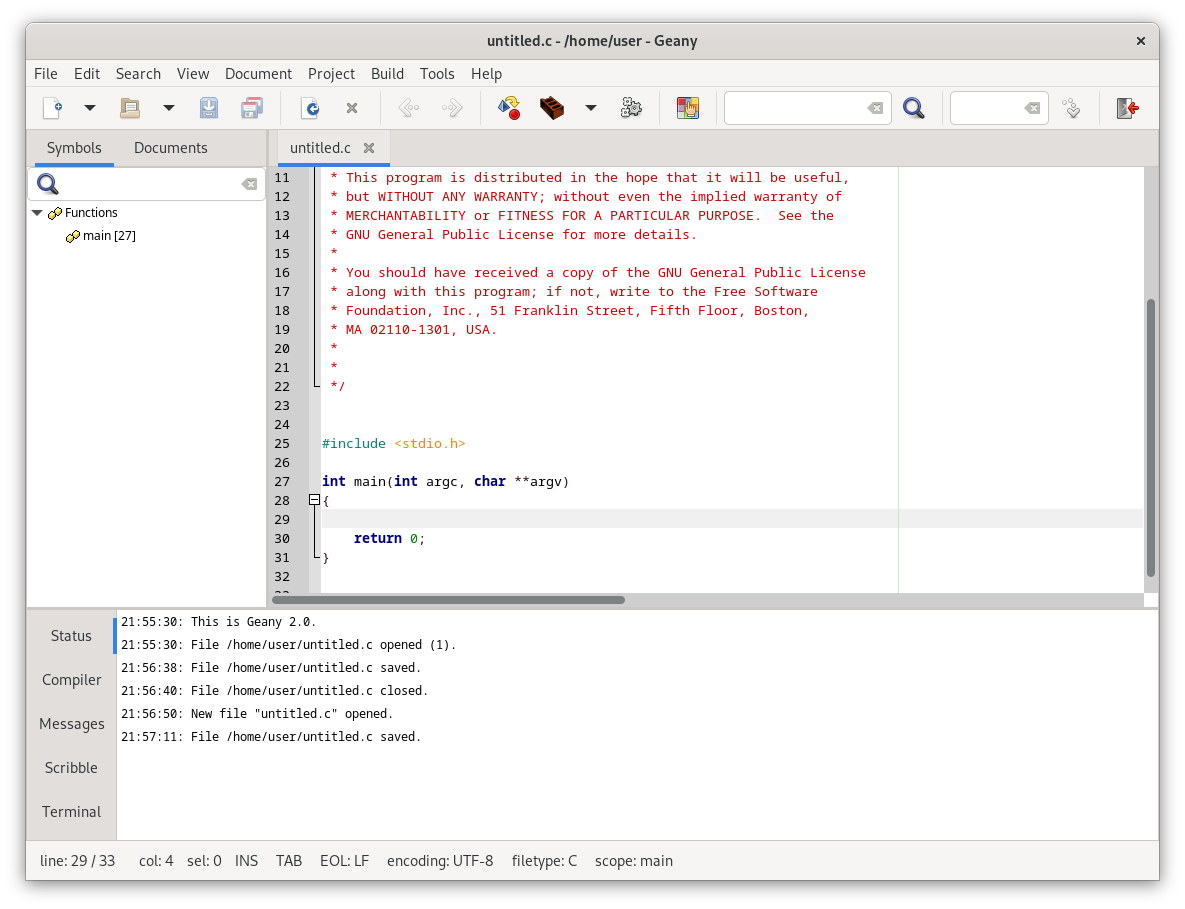
- Original author: Enrico Tröger
- Developer: Geany authors
- Release: October 19, 2005; 21 years ago
- Stable release: 2.1.0 / 6 July 2025
- Written in: C, C++
- Operating system: Linux macOS; Windows
- Size: 23 MB (Windows); 28 MB (MacOS); 32 MB (Linux)
- Type: IDE
- License: GPL-2.0-or-later
- Website: www.geany.org
- Repository: github.com/geany/geany

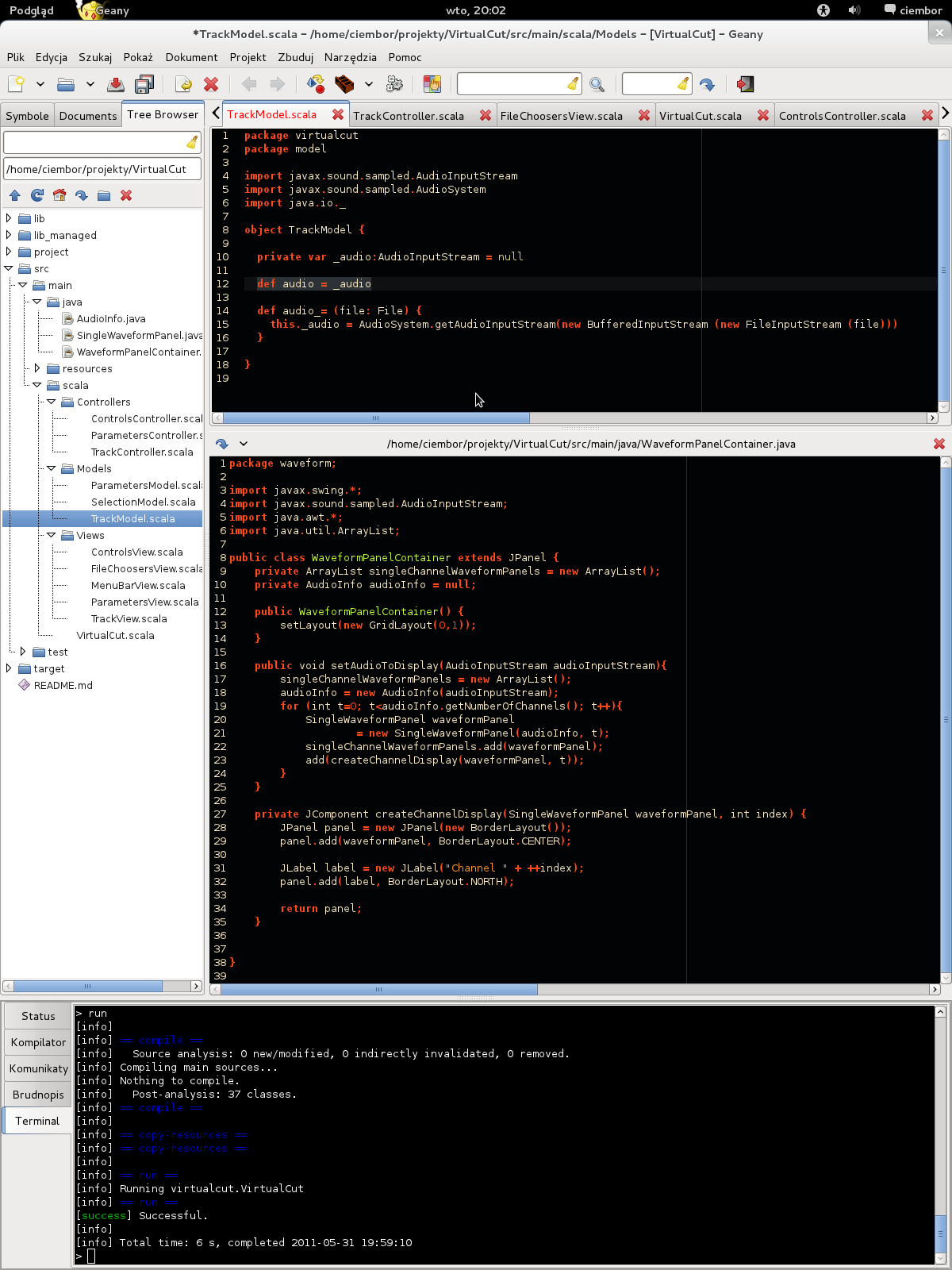
Customized Geany IDE

Geany (/dʒiːni/ JEE-NEE) is a free and open-source lightweight GUI text editor using Scintilla and GTK, including basic IDE features. It is designed to have short load times, with limited dependency on separate packages or external libraries on Linux. It has been ported to a wide range of operating systems, such as BSD, Linux, macOS, Solaris and Windows. The Windows port lacks an embedded terminal window.

On Linux it does not have proper Wayland support as of August 2026 with basic features like the clipboard not working. It does not run as native Wayland app and instead uses XWayland.

However there is discussion about porting the software to GTK4 eventually.

Geany resembles Notepad++ somewhat, which also uses Scintilla.

It is free software licensed under the terms of the GNU GPL version 2 or later.

== Version history ==
In 2012, the version number was increased to 1.22 from 0.21 to reflect the maturity of the product, as requested by many users. Geany version 1.29 is based on GTK+ 3.22. Version 1.36 is based on GTK+ 3.24.14. Version 1.37.1 is the last version with GTK+ 2.24 support.

== Features ==
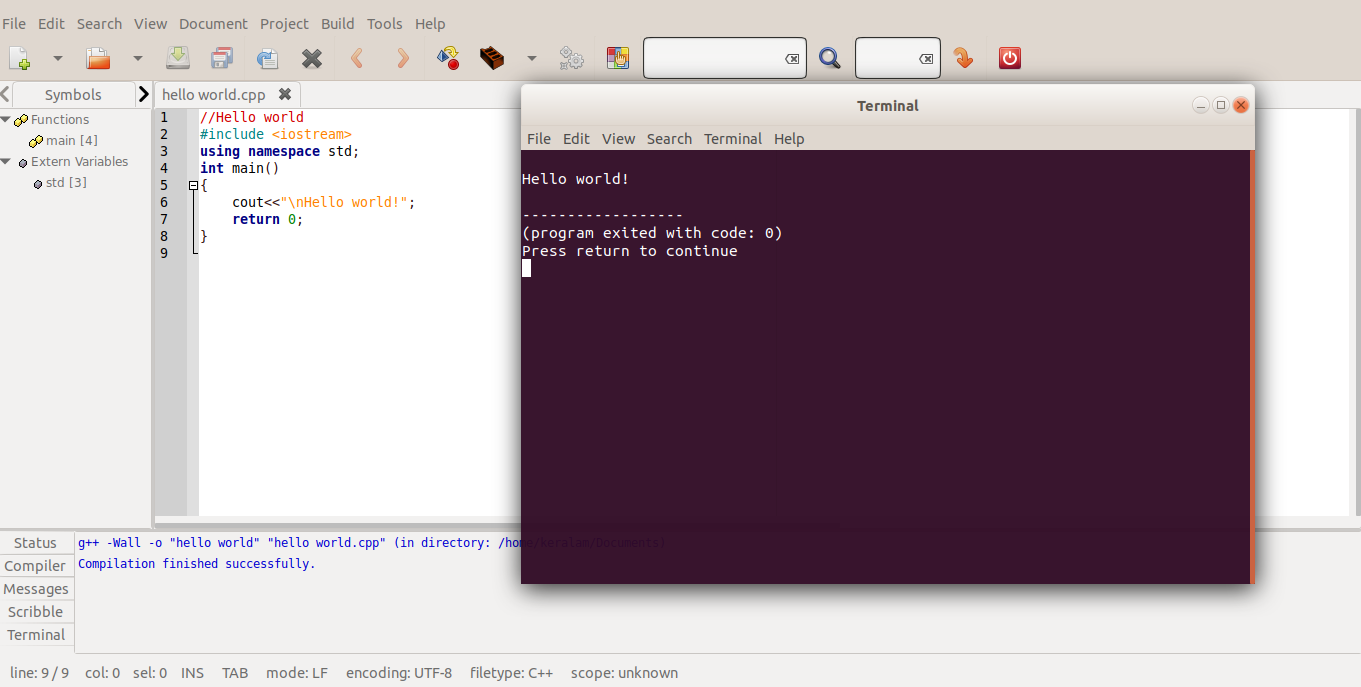
Example C++ program (with output) in Geany

- Auto-completion
- Bookmarks (called markers)
- Multiple document support
- Simple project management
- Syntax highlighting
- Code folding (partially)
- Symbol lists
- Code navigation
- Embedded terminal emulator
- Build system to compile and execute code using external tools
- Extensible via plugins
- Column / block / vertical select (via Shift + Ctrl + arrow keys)
- User configurable keyboard action to editor function mapping
- tree-structure-based collapsible file-paths in sidebar
- Over 70 supported file types: C, C++, C#, Ada, Java, JavaScript, PHP, HTML, LaTeX, CSS, Python, Perl, Ruby, Pascal, Haskell, Erlang, Vala and many others.

== Reception ==
Geany was received positively in articles on Linux.com and German Heise Online for editing programming code. However the dated Scintilla base has been found unsuitable to normal writing. Scintilla doesn't support proper caret movement between complex graphemes, bidirectional text and other features expected of modern text editors.

== See also ==
- Comparison of integrated development environments
- Code::Blocks
