= Basic4android =

Programming tool for Windows

- Developer: Erel Uziel
- Stable release: 12.0 / November 17, 2022; 3 years ago
- Operating system: Microsoft Windows
- Available in: English
- Type: Programming
- License: Apache License 2.0
- Website: www.b4x.com/b4a.html

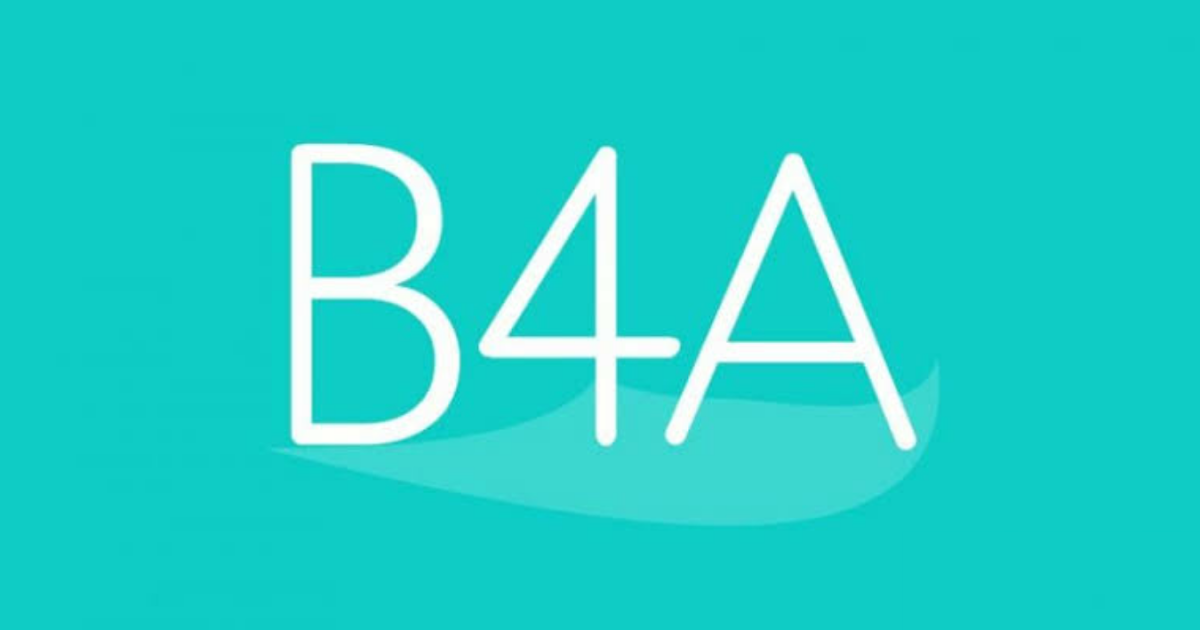
The current logo of the Basic Four Android programming language (B4A)

Basic4Android (currently known as B4A) is a rapid application development tool for native Android applications, developed and marketed by Anywhere Software Ltd.

B4A is an alternative to programming with Java. The language itself is similar to Visual Basic and Visual Basic .NET though it is adapted to the native Android environment. B4A is an object-based and event-driven language.

B4A includes a visual designer that simplifies the process of building user interfaces that target phones and tablets with different screen sizes. Compiled programs can be tested in AVD Manager emulators or on real Android devices using Android Debug Bridge and B4A Bridge.

B4A generates standard signed Android applications which can be uploaded to app stores like Google Play, Samsung Apps and Amazon Appstore. There are no special dependencies or runtime frameworks required.

Since February 2020, the full version is 100% free (donationware).

== Applications ==
B4A supports all types of applications such as games, databases, connectivity, sensors and hardware.

== Libraries ==
B4A interacts with the native API through Java libraries. B4A libraries consist of two files: the Java jar file and a XML file that is produced by a tool provided with B4A.

== Community ==
In 2013, there were about 100,000 registered developers in the online community.

== Documentation ==
A Basic4Android book was written by Wyken Seagrave and published by Penny Press Ltd in October 2013.

== See also ==
- Android Studio
- Mono for Android
- Comparison of programming languages
