= SlickEdit =

Cross-platform text editor and IDE

- Developers: SlickEdit, Inc.
- Stable release: 2024
- Operating system: Linux, macOS, Windows
- Size: ~642 MB
- Type: Source code editor
- License: Proprietary
- Website: www.slickedit.com

SlickEdit, previously known as Visual SlickEdit, is a cross-platform commercial source code editor, text editor, and Integrated Development Environment developed by SlickEdit, Inc. SlickEdit has integrated debuggers for GNU C/C++, Java, WinDbg, Clang C/C++ LLDB, Groovy, Google Go, Python, Perl, Ruby, Scala, PHP, Xcode, and Android JVM/NDK. SlickEdit includes built-in "beautifiers" that can enhance code as it is typed, code navigation, context tagging (also known as Intelligent code completion), symbol references, third-party tool integration, DIFFZilla (a file comparison tool), syntax highlighting, and 15 emulations (that include keyboard and selection styles).

In 2014, SlickEdit released a limited version of their product named SlickEdit Standard, and renamed their original product SlickEdit Pro.

== Features ==
SlickEdit runs on seven operating systems: Windows, MacOS. Linux, AIX, HP-UX, and Solaris (SPARC and x86)

SlickEdit supports over 76 programming languages and file types, including C, C++, C#, Groovy (programming language), Java, JavaScript, Objective-C, Google Go, HTML, PHP, XML, Windows batch files, AWK, Makefiles, and INI files. Some of these are only supported with syntax highlighting, such as Makefiles and INI files. Like most other code editors, SlickEdit allows the user to add support for additional languages and to modify the way it operates on the ones listed above. SlickEdit also supports opening Visual Studio solutions and Xcode projects as workspaces.

Slick-C is the proprietary scripting language of the editor. Much of the editor is actually written in Slick-C, and all the Slick-C source code is included with the product. This means that the user can look at how things work and modify the behavior to suit their needs.

SlickEdit can edit files up to 2 Terabytes.

== History ==
SlickEdit began in 1988 as a character-mode editor for MS-DOS and OS/2. Clark Maurer, currently CEO of SlickEdit Inc. (formerly MicroEdge Inc.), was employed at IBM's Watson research lab. He was the developer of the internal IBM editor E; the most popular internal program used at IBM at the time. This experience enabled him to quit IBM and begin development of the first SlickEdit releases.

At the beginning of the 1990s, most DOS editors were struggling with limitations of the 16-bit address space or DOS memory handling (640k). SlickEdit's programmers found a way to overcome these limitations.

As operating systems with graphical user interfaces became more popular, SlickEdit continued to produce versions of the program with high functionality and good usability. Today SlickEdit is feature rich in C++, C#, Java, JavaScript, PHP, HTML, Objective-C, Groovy, Google Go, and many more. SlickEdit can be used for everything from Web Development, IOS Development, Android software development, and Desktop Development to Mainframe Development. SlickEdit supports debugging for GNU C/C++, Java, WinDbg, Groovy, Google Go, Python, Perl, Ruby, PHP, Xcode, and Android JVM/NDK.

== Reception ==
In a review of version 11 of SlickEdit, released in 2006, Tom Plunket reviewing it for the Game Developer, suggested that it suffers from an overabundance of features:

SlickEdit ends up being a very complex piece of software. Some of its most promising features are hard to use, and configuring the program to work to any one developer's tastes can be tedious... its power can only be harnessed by people who are ready to spend considerable time learning how to truly use it.

In 2012, Shawn Powers also reviewed the software for the Linux Journal, concluding that it "is an amazing tool".

== Related products ==
- SlickEdit Core: Integrates the SlickEdit editor for use in the Eclipse IDE.

== See also ==
- Comparison of text editors
