= Eclipse Che =

Developer workspace server software

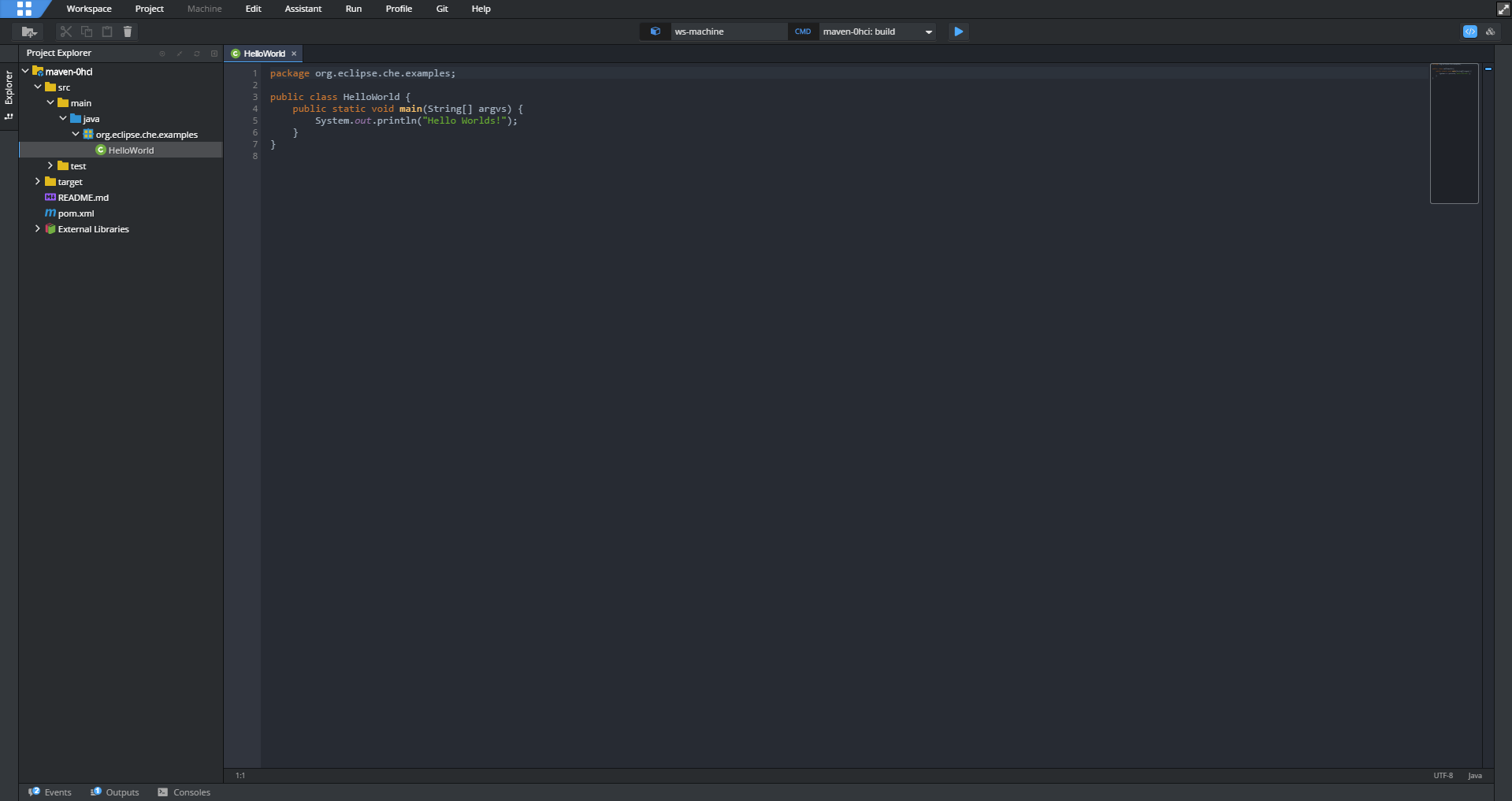
- The IDE of Eclipse Che
- Developer: Eclipse Foundation
- Initial release: 4.0 / 29 March 2016; 10 years ago
- Stable release: 7.118.0 / 26 May 2026; 10 days ago
- Operating system: Cross-platform: Linux, Mac OS X, Solaris, Windows
- Platform: Java SE
- Type: Programming tool, Integrated development environment (IDE)
- License: Since 6.9.0: EPL-2.0; Until 6.8.0: EPL-1.0
- Website: www.eclipse.org/che
- Repository: github.com/eclipse/che

Eclipse Che is an open-source, Java-based developer workspace server and online IDE (integrated development environment). It includes a multi-user remote development platform. The workspace server comes with a flexible RESTful webservice. It also contains a SDK for creating plug-ins for languages, frameworks or tools. Eclipse Che is an Eclipse Cloud Development (ECD) top-level project, allowing contributions from the user community.

== History ==
Eclipse Che was first announced in October 2014. One of its main contributors, Codenvy, delivered the technological stack which Che is based on. The idea behind the cloud based IDE and its development came up in early 2009 by the eXo Platform. After three years of ongoing development the project raised $9 million and developed a stand-alone business called Codenvy. After announcing the Che project including intellectual property donation and participation in the Eclipse Cloud Development project the development of the Che project began. Codenvy itself is today a commercial product built on top of Eclipse Che. Today, there are many contributors besides Codenvy like IBM, Red Hat, Samsung, SAP, Microsoft, Intuit, eXo Platform, WSO2, and Serli, as well as numerous open source contributors from Brazil, Canada, China, France, India, Russia, Sri Lanka, Ukraine, and United States.

=== Licensing ===
Eclipse Che is released under the Eclipse Public License which is similar to the Common Public License.

=== Name ===
The name "Che" is based on the fact that most of the development is done in Cherkasy (Ukraine).

== Supported languages and frameworks ==
By default, the following programming languages and frameworks are supported:

Category	Support
Languages	C, C++, C#, F#, Go, Java, JavaScript, PHP, Python, Ruby, SQL, TypeScript
Frameworks	AngularJS, Docker, .Net 2.0, Kubernetes, OpenShift, Yeoman
Builders	Ant, Bower, Grunt, Gulp, Maven, Npm
Tools	Git, Orion, SSH, Subversion

== Approach ==
Che itself is a workspace server running on an application server. Che provides an integrated IDE which can be used via a browser. After the initial load the IDE provides a dynamic user interface including known components like wizards, editors, toolbars and many more. The user has the opportunity to create workspaces, projects, environments, machines and many other modules that are needed to build a project from scratch. The communication between the user interface and the server is done using RESTful APIs that interact with the so-called Workspace Master. One workspace may include zero or more projects and must at least include one environment, which itself contains at least one machine. A machine is a runtime that has the necessary software installed. If the user adds for example a project which uses Apache Maven, the Workspace Master installs Maven on any machine in the workspace to ensure the project can be executed on each machine. Che comes with some predefined technology stacks to quickly set up a new machine. To ensure high flexibility and extensibility the user may also define custom technology stacks which can be used to set up new machines.

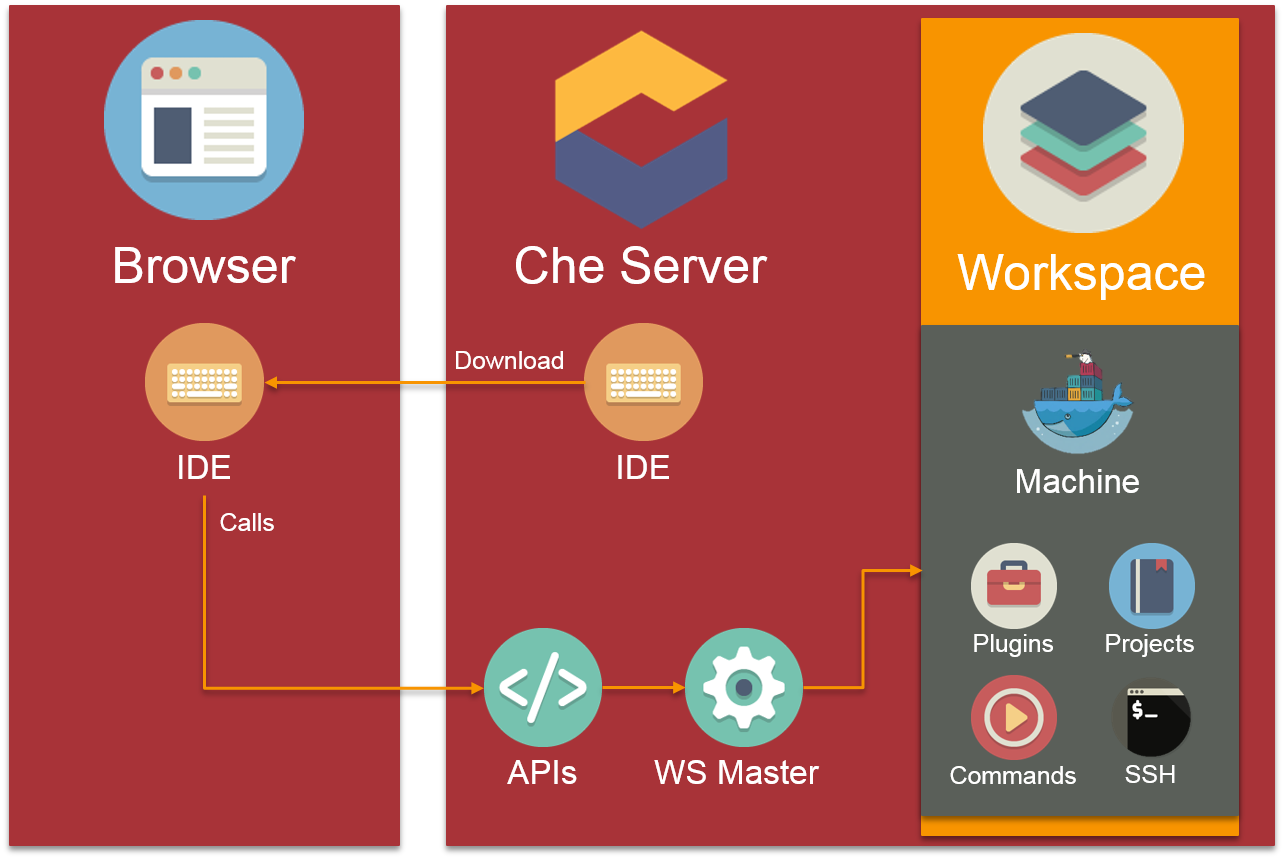
The workflow Eclipse Che has when opening the IDE and making changes in a workspace or project.

=== Technological stack ===
Eclipse Che is a Java application which runs by default on an Apache Tomcat server. The IDE which is used inside the browser is written using the Google Web Toolkit. Che is highly extensible since it delivers a SDK which can be used to develop new plug-ins which can be bundled to so called assemblies. Later on, an assembly can be executed as a stand-alone server application or desktop client using the included installers. The machines where the projects can be executed are managed by Docker.

=== Users ===
Che divides its users in three groups. The developers are the actual users of the IDE. This can either be by accessing a remote Che server or by having a local instance of Che running. Product owners may use Che to provide on-demand workspaces. Plug-In Providers can develop either client-side IDE or server-side workspace manager plug-ins.

== Features ==
Eclipse Che includes a range of functionality and flexibility:

- Portable Workspaces: Each workspace has its own configuration which can easily be persisted, migrated and integrated in other instances of Eclipse Che
- Docker Images: Each workspace contains so called machines which are used to execute projects. Each machine may have varying technologies installed and is managed by Docker.
- OpenShift Infrastructure Support: Run Che on OpenShift
- Workspace Agents: Each machine contains workspace agents which provide services like SSH access, monitoring and remote debugging for the user.
- Workspace Snapshots: Workspaces are by default transient. That means the environment state probably won’t be the same after the workspace is restarted. Using workspace snapshots the state of a workspace can be persisted and restarted later on.
- Multi-user and Multi-tenancy: Hundreds of developers or users are able to log into Che and collaborate. Which is often required for the largest teams and enterprises.
- Collaborative Workspaces: If Eclipse Che is hosted as a workspace server it can be accessed by multiple users and teams. Each user can easily develop the same application without the need to install software.
- Git Visualization: Files in both the project explorer and editor tabs can be colored based on their Git status.
- RESTful Workspaces: The communication between the browser IDE and the workspace manager is done by using the RESTful APIs the workspace manager exposes.
- Debugger: Navigate the thread of your code, setup conditions and suspend policies on breakpoints. Which allows you to diagnose and solve challenges
- DevOps: Developers are able to see and monitor the status of a machine using the IDE.
- Plug-In Framework: By providing a SDK to enable custom plug-in development Eclipse Che gains high extensibility.
- Open-Source: Eclipse Che has been developed over four years by a lot of contributors all over the world.

== Scaling ==
Since Che is a server application it can be accessed by multiple developers at once. Each developer can connect to the same workspace using the browser IDE. Right now, Eclipse "Che implements a last-write-wins policy when multiple users modify the same file." In a future release it is planned to include multi-cursor visuals to enable collaborative multi-user editing of a single file. Workspaces may get very large, because a workspace can have a lot of machines included. If a single host is no longer enough it is recommended to provide an own Che instance for each user or user group. That means, that you can have many servers running Che in the same ecosystem. Codenvy also offers a scaling ecosystem that can be installed on-demand or can be used as SaaS. In future releases it is also planned to enable remote Docker containers so users do not need to have all containers running on the same host.
