= DrJava =

Java integrated development environment

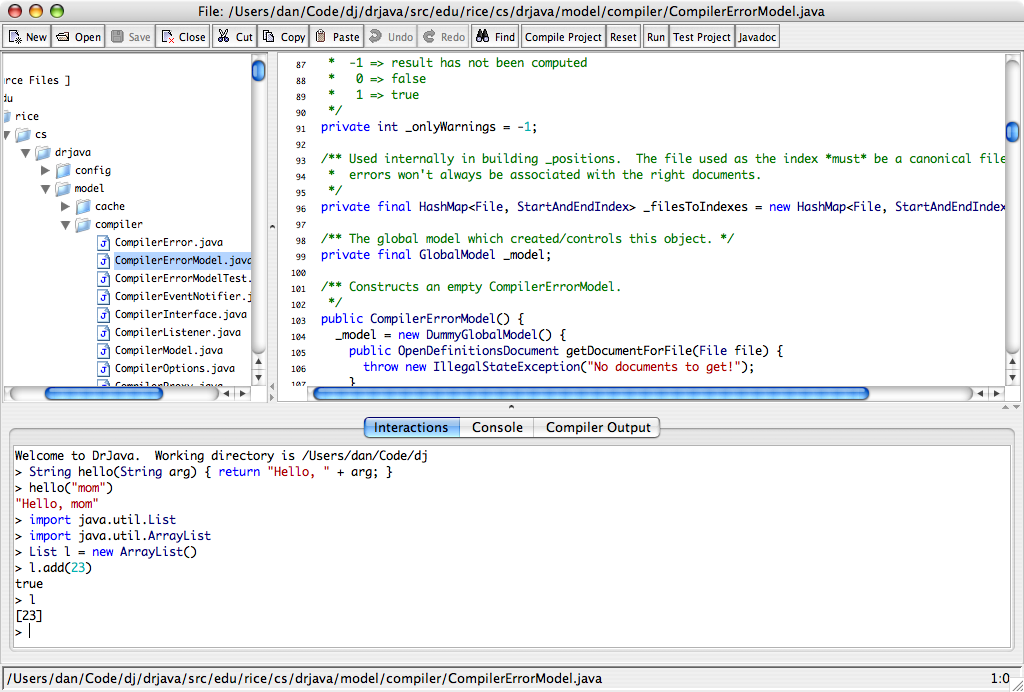
- DrJava on Mac OS X Tiger
- Developer(s): JavaPLT group at Rice University
- Initial release: June 19, 2002; 23 years ago
- Stable release: drjava-stable-20140826-r5761 / August 26, 2014; 10 years ago
- Preview release: drjava-beta-2019-220051 / August 13, 2019; 6 years ago
- Written in: Java
- Operating system: Cross-platform
- Available in: English
- Type: Java IDE
- License: DrJava Open Source License (BSD-style license)
- Website: www.cs.rice.edu/~javaplt/drjava/

DrJava is a lightweight integrated development environment for the Java programming language. Designed primarily for beginners and actively developed and maintained by the JavaPLT group at Rice University, its interface uses Sun Microsystems' Swing toolkit and therefore has a consistent appearance on different platforms. DrJava has the ability to interactively evaluate Java code from a console and to present output as well to the same console. It has many other features that have been designed for advanced users as well. DrJava offers a JUnit test facility.

There have been 4,332,375 downloads as of May 1, 2021.

== Version history ==
The version history of DrJava, as well as links for downloading the various versions, is maintained at SourceForge.
