= Comparison of text editors =

This article compares notable text editors. It may not be up-to-date or all-inclusive. Comparisons are between stable versions (not upcoming or beta releases) and are exclusive of any add-ons, extensions or external programs unless otherwise noted.

Other features can be listed via the Category of text editor features.

== General attributes ==
Name	Developer	Initial release	Latest release		Programming language	Cost (US$)	License	GUI	TUI or CLI
Name	Developer	Initial release	Version	Date	Programming language	Cost (US$)	License	GUI	TUI or CLI
Acme	Rob Pike	1993	Plan 9 and Inferno		C	No cost	MIT; GPL-2.0-only; LPL-1.02	Yes	No
Alphatk	Vince Darley	1999	8.3.3	2004-12-10		$40	Proprietary, with BSD components	Yes	No
Atom	GitHub	2014	1.63.1	2022-11-23	HTML, CSS, JavaScript, C++	No cost	MIT	Yes	No
BBEdit	Rich Siegel	1992	16.0	2026-05-21	Objective-C, Objective-C++	No cost for most features, $49.99 for full version	Proprietary	Yes	No
Bluefish	Bluefish Development Team	1999	2.4.2	2026-07-19	C	No cost	GPL-3.0-or-later	Yes	No
Brackets	Adobe Systems	2012	2.2.1	2023-03-22	HTML, CSS, JavaScript, C++	No cost	MIT	Yes	No
Coda	Panic	2007			Objective-C	$99	Proprietary	Yes	
ConTEXT	ConTEXT Project Ltd	1999			Object Pascal (Delphi)	No cost	BSD-3-Clause	Yes	
Crimson Editor	Ingyu Kang	1999	3.72-r286m	2011-10-01	C++	No cost	Proprietary	Yes	
ed	Ken Thompson	1970	unchanged from original		C	No cost	?	No	Yes
Editra	Cody Precord	2007	0.7.20	2013-01-05	Python	No cost	wxWindows license	Yes	No
EmEditor	Emurasoft, Inc.	1997	21.3.0	2021-11-24	C++	$39.99	Shareware	Yes	No
epsilon	Lugaru Software	1984	14.00	2020-10-20	C	$250	Proprietary		
FeatherPad	Pedram Pourang	2016	1.4.1	2023-06-12	C++, Qt	No cost	GPL-3.0-or-later	Yes	No
FocusWriter	Graeme Gott	2008	1.9.1	2026-07-23	C++, Qt	No cost	GPL-3.0-or-later	Yes	No
gedit	GNU Project	2000	49.0	2026-01-16	C	No cost	GPL-3.0	Yes	No
Geany	Enrico Tröger	2005	2.1.0	2025-07-06	C, GTK+	No cost	GPL-2.0-or-later	Yes	No
GNU Emacs	Richard Stallman	1984	31.1	2026-08-24	C, Emacs Lisp	No cost	GPL-3.0-or-later	Yes	Yes
GNU nano	Chris Allegretta	1999	9.3	2026-10-21	C	No cost	GPL-3.0-or-later	No	Yes
IA Writer	Information Architects	2010.09.22	7.2	2025-08-25	Objective-C (iOS), Objective-C (macOS), C# (Windows), Java (Android)	$29.99	Proprietary	Yes	No
JED	John E. Davis	1992	0.99-19	2009-12-13	C, S-Lang	No cost	GPL-2.0-or-later	No	Yes
jEdit	Slava Pestov	1998	5.7.0	2024-08-03	Java	No cost	GPL-2.0-or-later	Yes	No
JOE	Joseph Allen	1988	4.8	2026-04-23	C	No cost	GPL	No	Yes
JOVE	Johnathon Payne	1983	4.17.5.5	2025-05-14	C	No cost	JOVE license	No	Yes
Kate	KDE Project	2000-12	25.12.2	2026-02-01	C++	No cost	LGPL, MIT	Yes	No
KEDIT	Mansfield Software Group, Inc.	1983	1.6.1	2016-12-05	C	$129	Proprietary	No	Yes
Komodo Edit	Activestate	2007	12.0.1	2020-02-10	Python, JavaScript, Perl, Tcl, PHP, Ruby	No cost	MPL, GPL, LGPL	Yes	No
Komodo IDE	Activestate	2001			Python, JavaScript, Perl, Tcl, PHP, Ruby	$295	Proprietary	Yes	No
KWrite	KDE Project	2000	24.12.1	2025-01-09	C++	No cost	LGPL	Yes	No
LE	Alexander V. Lukyanov	1997	1.16.8	2021-02-05	C++	No cost	GPL-3.0-or-later	No	Yes
Leo	Edward K. Ream	1996	6.7.6	2023-12-19	Python	No cost	MIT	Yes	No
Light Table	Chris Granger	2012	0.8.1	2016-01-22	ClojureScript	No cost	MIT	Yes	No
mcedit	Miguel de Icaza	1994	4.8.33	2025-01-23	C, Python, PHP, Javascript, Perl, Tcl, Ruby	No cost	GPL-3.0-or-later	No	Yes
Metapad	Alexander Davidson	1999	3.6	2011-05-28	C	No cost	GPL-3.0-or-later	Yes	No
MinEd	Thomas Wolff	1992	2022.27	2022-12-23	C	No cost	GPL	No	Yes
MS-DOS Editor	Microsoft	1991	2.0.026			Bundled with MS-DOS, Microsoft Windows	Proprietary	No	Yes
ne	Sebastiano Vigna; Todd Lewis; Daniele Filaretti	1993	3.3.4	2025-02-06	C	No cost	GPL-3.0-or-later	No	Yes
NEdit	Mark Edel	1991	5.7	2017-02-08	C	No cost	GPL-2.0-or-later	Yes	No
Notepad	Microsoft	1985	11.2302.16.0		MASM (originally)	Bundled with Microsoft Windows	Proprietary	Yes	No
Notepad++	Don Ho	2003-11-25	8.9.8.1	2026-09-24	C++	No cost	GPL-3.0-or-later	Yes	No
nvi	Keith Bostic	1994	1.81.6	2007-11-18	C	No cost	BSD-3-Clause	No	Yes
Pico	University of Washington	1992	4.64		C	No cost	Apache-2.0	No	Yes
PolyEdit	PolySoft Solutions	1998	5.4	2010‑04‑07		$27.95	Shareware	Yes	No
PSPad	Jan Fiala	2002	5.5.1	2025-02-05	Object Pascal (Delphi)	No cost	Proprietary	Yes	No
RJ TextEd	Rickard Johansson	2004	15.63	2022-09-29	Object Pascal (Delphi)	No cost	Proprietary	Yes	No
Sam	Rob Pike	1980s (early)	stable		C	No cost	LPL (OSI approved)	No	Yes
SciTE	Neil Hodgson	1999	5.6.3	2026-06-06	C++	$41.99 for macOS. No cost for others	HPND	Yes	No
SlickEdit	SlickEdit, Inc.	1988	28.0.1	2024-01-21	C, Slick-C	$299	Proprietary	Yes	No
Smultron	Peter Borg	2004	12.0.6	2020-01-03	Objective-C	$7.99	Proprietary	Yes	No
SubEthaEdit	TheCodingMonkeys	2003	5.2.4	2022-01-08		No cost	MIT	Yes	
Sublime Text	Jon Skinner, Sublime HQ	2008	4 (Build 4215)	2026-09-25	C++, Python	$99	Shareware	Yes	No
TED Notepad	Juraj Simlovic	2001	6.3.1	2021-12-01	C	No cost	Proprietary	Yes	No
Textadept	Mitchell	2007	13.1	2026-11-01	C, Lua	No cost	MIT	Yes	Yes
TextEdit	Apple Inc.	2001	1.21	2026-07-13		No cost (also bundled with macOS)	BSD-3-Clause	Yes	No
TextMate	MacroMates	2004-10-10	2.0.23	2021-10-12	Objective-C++	No cost	GPL-3.0-or-later	Yes	No
TextPad	Helios Software Solutions	1992	9.3.0	2023-08-01		$30.00 (£16.50)	Shareware	Yes	No
TextWrangler	Bare Bones Software	2003	5.5.2	2016-09-20		No cost	Proprietary	Yes	
The SemWare Editor	Sammy Mitchell	1985-11	4.49	2023-01	C, SAL	No cost	BSD-2-Clause		
UltraEdit	IDM Computer Solutions	1994	25.0	2018-03-12	C++	$99.95	Proprietary	Yes	No
VEDIT	Ted Green, Greenview Data	1980	6.24.2	2015-01-12	Assembly, C	$89 standard, $239 Pro64	Proprietary	Yes	Yes
vi	Bill Joy	1976	3.7		C	No cost	BSD-4-Clause or CDDL	No	Yes
Vim	Bram Moolenaar	1991	9.2	2026-02-14	C, Vim script	No cost	Vim	Yes	Yes
Visual Studio Code	Microsoft	2015	1.142.0	2026-10-14	JavaScript, TypeScript	No cost	Source code: MIT; Binaries built by Microsoft: Proprietary	Yes	No
XEmacs	Lucid Inc.	1991	21.4.25	2026-01-12	C, Emacs Lisp	No cost	GPL-2.0-or-later	Yes	Yes
XNEdit	Olaf Wintermann	2018	1.5.2	2023-10-05	C	No cost	GPL-2.0-or-later	Yes	No

== Operating system support ==
	Windows	macOS	Linux	BSD	Unix	OpenVMS
Acme	Partial (Note: No native support, available as a part of the Inferno port for Windows or by using `plan9port` over the WSL.)	Yes	Yes	Yes	Yes	No
Alphatk	Yes	Yes	Yes	Yes	Yes	Yes
Atom	Yes	Yes	Yes	No	No	No
BBEdit	No	Yes	No	No	No	No
Bluefish	Yes	Yes	Yes	Yes	Yes	Yes
Brackets	Yes	Yes	Yes	No	No	No
Coda	No	Yes	No	No	No	No
ConTEXT	Yes	No	No	No	No	No
Crimson Editor	Yes	No	No	No	No	No
ed	Partial (Note: Requires Cygwin or the Windows Subsystem for Linux to run on Windows.)	Yes	Yes	Yes	Yes	Yes
Editra	Yes	Yes	Yes	?	?	?
EmEditor	Yes	No	No	No	No	No
epsilon	Yes	Yes	Yes	Yes	Yes	No
Geany	Yes	Yes	Yes	Yes	Yes	Yes
gedit	Yes	Yes (Note: GEdit, when installed from MacPorts, runs in X11 and, therefore, does not have a native look and feel. However, precompiled native macOS binaries for GEdit may be downloaded from the GEdit project page, or from the GEdit FTP download server.)	Yes	Yes	Yes	No
GNU Emacs	Yes	Yes	Yes	Yes	Yes	Yes
JED	Yes	Yes	Yes	Yes	Yes	Yes
jEdit	Yes	Yes	Yes	Yes	Yes	No
JOE	Yes	Yes	Yes	Yes	Yes	No
JOVE	Yes	Yes	Yes	Yes	Yes	No
Kate	Yes	Yes	Yes	Yes	Yes	No
KEDIT	Yes	No	No	No	No	No
Komodo Edit	Yes	Yes	Yes	Yes	?	?
Komodo IDE	Yes	Yes	Yes	Yes	?	?
KWrite	Yes	Yes	Yes	Yes	Yes	No
LE	Partial	Yes	Yes	Yes	Yes	No
Light Table	Yes	Yes	Yes	No	No	No
Metapad	Yes	No	No	No	No	No
MinEd	Yes	Yes	Yes	Yes	Yes	Yes
GNU nano	Yes	Yes	Yes	Yes	Yes	No
ne	Partial	Yes	Yes	Yes	Yes	No
NEdit	Partial	Yes (Note: gedit, NEdit, and SciTE run in the X11 window environment, and therefore do not use the native Aqua look-and-feel when running on macOS.)	Yes	Yes	Yes	Yes
Notepad	Yes	No	No	No	No	No
Notepad++	Yes	No	No	No	No	No
nvi	No	Yes	Yes	Yes	Yes	No
Pico	Yes	Yes	Yes	Yes	Yes	Yes
PSPad	Yes	No	No	No	No	No
RJ TextEd	Yes	No	No	No	No	No
Sam	Partial	Yes	Yes	Yes	Yes	No
SciTE	Yes	Yes	Yes	Yes	Yes	No
SlickEdit	Yes	Yes	Yes	No	Yes	No
Smultron	No	Yes	No	No	No	No
SubEthaEdit	No	Yes	No	No	No	No
Sublime Text	Yes	Yes	Yes	No	No	No
TED Notepad	Yes	No	No	No	No	No
Textadept	Yes	Yes	Yes	Yes	No	No
TextEdit	No	Yes	No	No	No	No
TextMate	No	Yes	No	No	No	No
TextPad	Yes	No	No	No	No	No
TextWrangler	No	Yes	No	No	No	No
The SemWare Editor	Yes	No	Yes	No	No	No
UltraEdit	Yes	Yes	Yes	No	No	No
Ulysses (text editor)	No	Yes	No	No	No	No
vi	Yes	Yes	Yes	Yes	Yes	Yes
Vim	Yes	Yes	Yes	Yes	Yes	Yes
Visual Studio Code	Yes	Yes	Yes	No	No	No
XEmacs	Yes	Yes	Yes	Yes	Yes	Yes
XNEdit	Partial (Note: Stand alone NSIS installable package is available)	Yes	Yes	Yes	Yes	No

== Natural language (localization) ==
	Languages
Acme	English
Alphatk	English
Atom	English
BBEdit	English
Brackets	English, German, French, Polish(Outdated), Korean, Japanese, Italian, Czech, Dutch, Portuguese, Spanish, Swedish(Outdated)
Coda	English, German, French, Spanish
ConTEXT	English, German, French, Polish, Italian, Dutch, Portuguese, Spanish
Crimson Editor	English
ed	
Editra	English, German, French, Polish, Japanese, Italian, Dutch, Portuguese, Spanish, Swedish
EmEditor	English, German, French, Korean, Japanese, Italian, Dutch, Spanish
epsilon	English
Geany	English, German, French, Polish, Japanese, Italian, Dutch, Portuguese, Spanish, Swedish, Hindi
gedit	English, German, French, Polish, Korean, Japanese, Italian, Dutch, Portuguese, Spanish, Swedish, Hindi
GNU Emacs	English
JED	English
jEdit	English
JOE	English, German, French
JOVE	English
Kate	English, German, French, Polish, Japanese, Italian, Dutch, Portuguese, Spanish, Swedish
KEDIT	English
Komodo Edit	English
KWrite	English, German, Italian, Spanish, Swedish
Metapad	English, German, French, Polish, Korean, Japanese, Italian, Dutch, Portuguese, Spanish, Swedish
mined	English
MS-DOS Editor	English, German, French, Polish, Korean, Japanese, Italian, Dutch, Portuguese, Spanish, Swedish
Nano	English, German, French, Italian, Portuguese
NEdit	English
Notepad	English, German, French, Polish, Korean, Japanese, Italian, Dutch, Portuguese, Spanish, Swedish, Hindi
Notepad++	English, German, French, Polish, Korean, Japanese, Italian, Dutch, Portuguese, Spanish, Swedish, Hindi
nvi	English
Pico	English, Italian
PolyEdit	English
PSPad	English, German, French, Polish, Japanese, Italian, Czech, Dutch, Portuguese, Spanish, Swedish
RJ TextEd	English, German, French, Polish, Japanese, Italian, Dutch, Portuguese, Spanish, Swedish
Sam	English
SciTE	English, German, French (Outdated (1.72)), Polish, Japanese (Outdated (1.62)), Italian, Dutch (Outdated (1.67)), Portuguese (Outdated (1.63)), Spanish, Swedish
SlickEdit	English
Smultron	English, German, French, Japanese, Italian, Dutch, Spanish, Swedish
SubEthaEdit	English
TED Notepad	English
TextEdit	English, German, French, Polish, Japanese, Italian, Dutch, Portuguese, Spanish, Swedish
TextMate	English
TextPad	English, German, French, Polish (Outdated (4.7.3)), Japanese, Italian(Outdated (4.7.3)), Dutch (Outdated (4.7.3)), Spanish (Outdated (4.7.3)), Portuguese (Outdated (4.7.3))
TextWrangler	English
The SemWare Editor	English
UltraEdit	English, German, French, Korean, Italian, Spanish, Portuguese, Japanese, Chinese
VEDIT	English
vi	English
Vim	Afrikaans, Catalan, Chinese(Simplified), Chinese(Taiwan), Czech, Danish, Dutch, German, English(UK), English(US), Esperanto, Finnish, French, Irish, Italian, Japanese, Korean, Latvian, Norwegian(Bokmål), Polish, Portuguese(Brazil), Russian, Serbian, Slovak, Spanish, Swedish, Ukrainian, Vietnamese
Visual Studio Code	English, Bulgarian, Chinese, French, German, Hungarian, Italian, Japanese, Korean, Portuguese, Russian, Spanish, Turkish
XEmacs	English
XNEdit	English

== Document interface ==
The following table identifies the following attributes of an editor that describe its user experience with respect to multiple documents:

Multiple instances
Whether multiple instances of the program can be open at the same time for editing multiple files (one in each instance). Applies both for single-document interface (SDI) and multiple-document interface (MDI). Also, applies for a program that has a user interface that looks like multiple instances of the same program (such as some versions of Word).
Single document window splitting
Whether a window can be split to simultaneously view different areas of a file.
MDI overlappable windows
Whether each open document gets its own fully movable window inside the editor environment.
MDI tabbed document interface
Whether multiple documents can be viewed as tabs in a single window.
MDI window splitting
Whether supports splitting the application window to show multiple documents (non-overlapping windows).

Text editor support for common document interfaces
	Multiple instances	Single document window splitting	MDI overlappable windows	MDI tabbed document interface	MDI window splitting
Acme	Yes	Yes	No	No	Yes
Alphatk	Yes	Yes	Yes	Yes	Yes
Atom	Yes	Yes	Yes	Yes	Yes
BBEdit	Yes	Yes	Yes	Yes	Yes
Bluefish	Yes	Yes	Yes	Yes	No
Brackets	No	No	No	Yes	Yes
Coda	Yes	Yes	Yes	Yes	Yes
ConTEXT	Yes	No	Yes	Yes	No
Crimson Editor	Yes	Yes	Yes	Yes	Yes
ed	Yes	No	No	No	No
Editra	Yes	Yes	?	Yes	?
EmEditor	Yes	Yes	Yes	Yes	Yes
Geany	Yes	Yes; Plug‑in	No	Yes	No
gedit	Yes	Yes; Plug‑in (Note: gedit supports single document window splitting via plug‑ins. Archived 2011-12-14 at the Wayback Machine.)	Yes	Yes	Yes; Plug‑in (Note: gedit supports multiple document window splitting via plug‑ins. Archived 2011-12-14 at the Wayback Machine.)
GNU Emacs	Yes	Yes	Yes	Yes (Note: GNU Emacs 27.1 includes built-in support for tab bar (per-frame) and tab-line (per-window). Earlier versions of GNU Emacs can use a tabbed document interface in a non OS-native way using the Tabbar plug‑in.) (Note: GNU Emacs can support a tabbed document interface modelled after GNU Screen using the elscreen Archived 2008-01-17 at the Wayback Machine package.)	Yes
JED	Yes	Yes	No	No	Yes
jEdit	Yes	Yes	No	Yes	Yes
JOE	Yes	Yes	No	No (Note: JOE supports editing multiple files but only seeing one of them, and switching to others via Ctrl+K+N, which is functionally equivalent to having tabs but no visible tab bar.)	Yes
JOVE	Yes	Yes	No	No	Yes
Kate	Yes	Yes	No	Yes	Yes
KEDIT	Yes	Yes	Yes	No	Yes
Komodo Edit	Yes	Yes	No	Yes	Yes
Komodo IDE	Yes	Yes	No	Yes	Yes
KWrite	Yes	No	No	No	No
LE	Yes	No	No	No	No
Light Table	Yes	No	No	Yes	Yes
Metapad	Yes	No	No	No	No
mined	Yes	No	No (Note: mined supports Copy/Paste between multiple documents in separate windows, when these documents are in separate terminal windows)	Yes	No
MS-DOS Editor	Yes	Yes	No	No	Yes
Nano	Yes	No	No	No	No
NEdit	Yes	Yes	No	Yes	Yes
Notepad	Yes	No	No	Yes	No
Notepad++	Yes	Yes	No	Yes	Yes; 2 windows
nvi	Yes	Yes	No	No	Yes
Pico	Yes	No	No	No	No
PolyEdit	No	No	Yes	Yes	Yes
PSPad	Yes	Yes	Yes	Yes	Yes
RJ TextEd	Yes	Yes	Yes	Yes	Yes
Sam	Yes	No	Yes	No	No
SciTE	Yes	No	No	Yes (Note: SciTE_max_buffers)	No
SlickEdit	Yes	Yes	Yes	Yes	Yes
Smultron	Yes	Yes	No	Yes	Yes
SubEthaEdit	Yes	Yes	No	Yes	No
TED Notepad	?	?	?	No	?
TextEdit	Yes	No	No	No	No
TextMate	Yes	No	No	Yes	No
TextPad	Yes	Yes	Yes	Yes	Yes
TextWrangler	Yes	Yes	Yes	Yes	Yes
The SemWare Editor	Yes	Yes	No	No	Yes
UltraEdit	Yes	Yes	Yes	Yes	Yes
VEDIT	Yes	Yes	Yes	Yes	Yes
vi	Yes	No	No	No	No
Vim	Yes	Yes	Yes (Note: Vim Provided GVim is used.)	Yes (Note: Vim version 7 supports a tabbed document interface. Earlier versions can emulate tabs through scripts, for example.)	Yes
Visual Studio Code	Yes	Yes	No	Yes	Yes
XEmacs	Yes	Yes	Yes	Yes	Yes
XNEdit	Yes	Yes	No	Yes	Yes

== Basic features ==
	Spell checking	Regex-based find & replace	Encoding conversion	Newline conversion	Multiple undo/redo	Rectangular block selection	Virtual space support
Acme	Yes external (Note: Acme can invoke external commands and display their return values in order to integrate additional functionality.)	Yes	Yes	Yes	Yes	No	?
Alphatk	Yes	Yes	Yes	Yes	Yes	Yes	?
Atom	Yes	Yes	Yes	Yes	Yes	Yes; Plug‑in	No
BBEdit	Yes	Yes	Yes	Yes	Yes	Yes	?
Bluefish	Yes	Yes	Yes	Yes	Yes	No	?
Brackets	Yes; Plug‑in	Yes	Yes; Plug‑in	No	Yes	Yes	?
Coda	Yes	Yes	Yes	Yes	Yes	Yes	?
ConTEXT	No	Partial (Note: ConTEXT does not support regular expression backreferences in its search and replace function. Deprecated link archived 2007-12-18 at archive.today)	Partial (Note: ConTEXT only supports converting text to UTF-16. Also, it can only use one type of new-line format if converting to UTF-16.)	Yes	Yes	Yes	?
Crimson Editor	Yes; Instant/live (like Firefox)	Yes	Yes	Yes	Yes	Yes	?
ed	No	Yes	No	No	No	No	?
Editra	Yes	Yes	?	?	?	Yes	?
EmEditor	Yes	Yes	Yes	Yes	Yes	Yes	Yes
Geany	Yes; Plug‑in (Note: Geany supports spell checking via a plug‑in)	Yes	Yes	Yes	Yes	Yes	Yes
gedit	Yes (Note: gedit supports spell checking via a plug‑in, which is distributed with gedit.)	Yes; Plug‑in (Note: gedit supports Regex-based find & replace via plug‑ins ( Archived 2011-12-14 at the Wayback Machine).)	Yes	Yes	Yes	plug‑in	?
GNU Emacs	Yes; Plug‑in (Note: Emacs supports spell checking via the external programs ispell, aspell, or Hunspell.)	Yes	Yes	Yes	Yes	Yes	Yes
JED	Yes	Yes	Yes	Yes	Yes	Yes	?
jEdit	Yes; Plug‑in (Note: jEdit supports spell checking via an external plug‑in.)	Yes	Yes	Yes	Yes	Yes	Yes
JOE	Yes; Plug‑in (Note: JOE supports spell checking via the ispell or aspell external plug‑ins.)	Partial (Note: JOE uses a non-standard regular expression syntax.)	No (Note: JOE can easily pipe text through the GNU recode(1) utility; it detects locale settings and allows editing in any encoding set up by the environment.)	Yes	Yes	Yes	?
JOVE	Yes	Yes	No	No	Yes	Yes	?
Kate	Yes	Yes	Yes	Yes	Yes	Yes	No
KEDIT	No	Yes	No	Yes	Yes	Yes	?
Komodo Edit	Yes	Yes	Yes	Yes	Yes	Yes	? (Note: Komodo Edit is based on Scintilla and may support virtual space similar to Geany and Notepad++ ())
Komodo IDE	Yes	Yes	Yes	Yes	Yes	Yes	? (Note: Komodo IDE is based on Scintilla and may support virtual space similar to Geany and Notepad++ ())
KWrite	Yes	Yes	Yes	Yes	Yes	Yes	?
LE	No	Yes	No (Note: LE can pipe text through the GNU recode(1) utility)	Yes	Yes	Yes	?
Light Table	Yes; Plug‑in	?	No	No	Yes	?	?
Metapad	Partial (Note: Metapad spell checking by calling external program Aspell.)	No	Yes	Yes	Yes	No	?
MinEd	No	Yes (Note: mined supports multiple lines in search and replacement expressions.)	Yes (Note: mined can convert the encoding format when using the Copy & Paste feature between multiple documents (that have different encodings).)	Yes (Note: mined supports new-line conversion via a command-line option or from the menu. Files with mixed newline types can be edited transparently; different kinds of new-line have different visual indications.)	No	Yes	?
MS-DOS Editor	No	No	No	Yes	No	No	Yes
Nano	Yes	Yes	No	Yes	Yes	No	?
ne	No	Yes	No	No	Yes	Yes	?
NEdit	Yes; Plug‑in	Yes	No	Yes	Yes	Yes	?
Notepad	No	No	Partial	Partial	Yes	No	?
Notepad++	Yes	Yes	Yes	Yes	Yes	Yes	Yes
nvi	No	Yes	No	No	Yes	?	?
Pico	Yes	No	No	No	No	No	?
PolyEdit	Yes	Yes	Yes	Yes	Yes	Yes	?
PSPad	Yes	Yes	Yes	Yes	Yes	Yes	?
RJ TextEd	Yes	Yes	Yes	Yes	Yes	Yes	?
Sam	Yes external (Note: It is possible to start external applications from inside Sam and display their return values.)	Yes	No	No	Yes	No	?
SciTE	No	Limited (Note: Scintilla-based editors such as SciTE, Notepad2 and Notepad++ do not support alternation ()	No	Yes	Yes	Yes	?
SlickEdit	Yes	Yes	Yes	Yes	Yes	Yes	Yes
Smultron	Yes	Yes	Yes	Yes	Yes	Yes	?
SubEthaEdit	Yes	Yes	Yes	Yes	Yes	Yes	?
Sublime Text	Yes	Yes	Yes	Yes	Yes	Yes	No
TED Notepad	No	No	No	Yes	Yes	No	?
TextEdit	Yes	No	Yes	Yes	Yes	Yes	?
TextMate	Yes	Yes	Partial	Yes	Yes	Yes	?
TextPad	Yes	Yes	Yes	Yes	Yes	Yes	?
TextWrangler	Yes	Yes	Yes	Yes	Yes	Yes	?
The SemWare Editor	Yes	Yes	No	Yes	Yes	Yes	?
UltraEdit	Yes	Limited (Note: UltraEdit uses the Boost C++ regex library. While Boost supports backreferences past \9 with \g{10}, UltraEdit has not yet implemented this feature.)	Yes	Yes	Yes	Yes	?
VEDIT	Yes (Note: VEDIT 6.2 comes with Scribe spelling checker which has been written entirely in Vedit macro language. In addition, macro package for integrating Aspell can be downloaded here.)	Yes	Yes	Yes	Yes	Yes	?
vi	No	Yes	No	No	No	No	?
Vim	Yes (Note: Vim version 7 supports spell checking natively. Earlier versions require a script.)	Yes	Yes	Yes	Yes	Yes	No
Visual Studio Code	Yes; Plug‑in	Yes	Yes	Yes	Yes	Limited (Note: Visual Studio Code does not support virtual space, and rectangular selection beyond line endings is not possible.)	No
XEmacs	Yes; Plug‑in	Yes	Yes	Yes	Yes	Yes	?
XNedit	Yes; Plug‑in	Yes	Yes	Yes	Yes	Yes	?

== Programming features ==
	Syntax highlighting	Function list	Symbol database	Bracket matching	Auto indentation	Auto completion	Code folding	Text folding	Compiler integration
Acme	No	Yes external	Yes external	Yes	Yes	Partial (Note: Acme's auto-completion only works on file names.)	No	No	Yes external
Alphatk	Yes	?	?	Yes	Yes	Yes	Yes	Yes	Yes
Atom	Yes	Yes	Yes	Yes	Yes	Yes	Yes	Yes	Yes; Plug‑in
BBEdit	Yes	Yes	Yes	Yes	Yes	Yes	Yes	Yes	Yes
Bluefish	Yes	No	Yes	Yes	Yes	Yes	Yes	No	Yes (Note: bluefish: Configurable via the outputbox feature.)
Brackets	Yes	Yes	No	Yes	Yes	Yes	Yes	Yes	Yes; Plug‑in
Coda	Yes	Yes	Yes	Yes	Yes	Yes	Yes	No	No
ConTEXT	Yes	?	?	Yes	Yes	Yes	No	No	Yes
Crimson Editor	Yes	No	Partial (Note: With external tool OpenCTags)	Yes	Yes	No	No	No	Yes
ed	No	No	No	No	No	No	No	No	Yes external (Note: ed can invoke external commands, like a compiler.)
Editra	Yes	?	?	Yes	Yes	?	Yes	?	?
EmEditor	Yes	Yes; Plug‑in	Yes; Plug‑in	Yes	Yes	Yes; Plug‑in (Note: EmEditor Professional supports Auto Complete via plug‑ins (32-bit or 64-bit).)	Yes	Yes	Yes
Geany	Yes	Yes	Yes (Note: Geany uses its own tags file format, not compatible with ctags, see the manual.)	Yes	Yes	Yes	Partial	No	Yes
gedit	Yes	Yes; Plug‑in	Yes; Plug‑in	Yes	Yes	Yes; Plug‑in	No	Yes; Plug‑in (Note: gedit-folding: Folding plug‑in for Gedit)	Yes (Note: gedit: Compiler integration: Functionality in plug‑ins installed with gedit.)
GNU Emacs	Yes	Yes	Yes	Yes	Yes	Yes	Yes	Yes	Yes
JED	Yes	Yes	Yes	Yes	Yes	Yes	Yes	Yes	Yes
jEdit	Yes	Yes; Plug‑in	Yes; Plug‑in	Yes	Yes	Yes	Yes	Yes	Yes; Plug‑in
JOE	Yes	?	Yes	Yes	Yes	?	No	No	Yes
JOVE	No	No	No	Yes	Yes	No	No	No	Yes
Kate	Yes	Yes; Plug‑in	Yes; Plug‑in	Yes	Yes	Yes	Yes	Yes	Yes; Plug‑in
KEDIT	Yes	No	Yes; Macro	Yes	Yes	No	Yes	Yes	Yes
Komodo Edit	Yes	Yes	No	Yes	Yes	Yes	Yes	Yes	No
Komodo IDE	Yes	Yes	Yes	Yes	Yes	Yes	Yes	Yes	Yes
KWrite	Yes	?	?	Yes	Yes	Yes	Yes	Yes	No
LE	Yes	No	No	Yes	Yes	No	No	No	No (Note: make can be launched from the LE text editor, but the output is not captured)
Light Table	Yes	No	No	Yes	Yes	Yes	No	No	Partial (Note: Evaluates expressions in some dynamic languages such as Clojure, Python and Javascript in realtime)
Metapad	No	No	No	No	Yes	No	No	No	No
mined	Yes (Note: mined: Syntax highlighting: HTML/XML, Javascript, JSP.)	?	Yes	Yes	Yes	No	No	No	No
MS-DOS Editor	No	No	No	No	No	No	No	No	No
Nano	Yes	No	No	Yes	Yes	Yes	No	No	No
ne	Yes	No	No	Yes	Yes	Yes	No	No	No
NEdit	Yes	Yes; Plug‑in	Yes	Yes	Yes	Yes; Plug‑in	No	No	Yes
Notepad	No	No	No	No	No	No	No	No	No
Notepad++	Yes	Yes (Note: Notepad++ comes with Function List support, and it can be enhanced via plugins.)	Yes	Yes	Yes	Yes (Note: Notepad++ installs with auto complete list for multiple programming languages. Has user option to add additional personalized auto complete list(s).)	Yes	Yes	Yes
nvi	No	?	Yes	Yes	Yes	Yes	No	No	No
Pico	No	No	No	No	No	No	No	No	No
PolyEdit	Yes	No	No	No	No	No	No	No	No
PSPad	Yes	Yes	Yes; Plug‑in	Yes	Yes	Yes	No	No	Yes
RJ TextEd	Yes	Yes	Yes	Yes	Yes	Yes	Yes	Yes	Yes
Sam	No	No	No	No	No	No	No	No	Yes external
SciTE	Yes	No (Note: Function list (and stuff) available in Ru-Board build, ver 1.79.66Ru and later)	?	Yes	Yes	Yes	Yes	Yes	Yes
SlickEdit	Yes	Yes	Yes	Yes	Yes	Yes	Yes	Yes	Yes
Smultron	Yes	No	No	Yes	Yes	Yes	?	?	?
SubEthaEdit	Yes	?	?	Yes	Yes	Yes	Yes	Yes	Yes
TED Notepad	No	?	?	No	Yes	Yes	No	No	No
TextEdit	No	No	No	No	No	No	No	No	No
TextMate	Yes	Yes	Yes; Plug‑in	Yes	Yes	Yes (Note: TextMate: Auto complete: Supported language bundles)	Yes	Yes	No
TextPad	Yes	No	Yes; Plug‑in (Note: Textpad uses an add-on ())	Yes	Yes	No	No	No	Yes
TextWrangler	Yes	Yes	No	Yes	Yes	Yes	Yes	Yes	Yes; Plug‑in (Note: TextWrangler can integrate with a compiler if you write a shell script that takes flag input of the code and compiles it. You place this in ~/Library/Application Support/TextWrangler/Unix Support/Unix Filters/. It should show in the #! menu.)
The SemWare Editor	Yes	Yes	Yes; Plug‑in	Yes	Yes	Yes (Note: The Semware Editor: Auto complete: Supported via supplied/user-created lists.)	Partial (Note: The Semware Editor: Text folding: Compressed view possible.)	No	Yes
UltraEdit	Yes	Yes	Partial (Note: Not in the Linux version.)	Yes	Yes	Yes	Yes	Yes	Yes
VEDIT	Yes	Yes	Yes	Yes	Yes	Yes < (Note: Vedit: Auto complete: Template editing, plus 3rd party macro for expanding symbols from tags database.)	No	No	Yes
vi	No	No	Yes	Yes	No	No	No	No	Yes
Vim	Yes	Yes; Plug‑in	Yes	Yes	Yes	Yes	Yes	Yes	Yes
Visual Studio Code	Yes	Yes	Yes	Yes	Yes	Yes	Yes	Yes	Yes
XEmacs	Yes	?	Yes	Yes	Yes	Yes	Yes	Yes	Yes
XNEdit	Yes	Yes; Plug‑in	Yes	Yes	Yes	Yes; Plug‑in	No	No	Yes

== Additional programming features ==
	CLI shell integration	GUI shell integration	Macro language	Collaborative editing	Large file support	Long line support	Multi-line regex support	Search in files
Acme	Yes	Yes	Yes; Extensible	No	?	?	Yes	?
Alphatk	Yes	Yes	Yes (Note: Alpha Macro support via AppleScript, Tcl or text factories.)	No	?	?	?	?
Atom	No	?	Yes; Plug‑in	Yes	No ~27 MB	Soft-wrapping	No	Yes
BBEdit	Yes	Yes	Yes (Note: BBEdit Macro support via AppleScript, Perl, Python, Lasso, shell scripts or text factories.)	No	memory	Yes	Yes	Yes
Bluefish	No	Yes	?	Yes	?	?	Yes	?
Brackets	Yes	Yes	Yes; Extensible	No	No	?	Partial	Yes
Coda	Yes	No	Yes (Note: Coda offers macros via AppleScript, text "clips,"or plug‑ins (Cocoa apps or any installed scripting language).)	Yes	?	?	Yes	Yes
ConTEXT	No	Yes	Yes	No	memory (Note: name)	?	No	?
Crimson Editor	No	Yes	Yes	No	No	?	No	?
ed	Yes	No	Yes	Yes via mkfifo	?	?	?	Yes
Editra	?	?	?	?	Yes; 2 GB	?	?	?
EmEditor	Yes	Yes	Yes	No	Yes; 16TB	?	Yes	Yes
Geany	Yes	?	Yes; Plug‑in	?	?	?	Yes	Yes
gedit	Yes	Yes	Yes (Note: Cssed Macro support via Python.)	Yes; Plug‑in	No	?	Yes	Yes; Plug‑in
GNU Emacs	Yes	Yes	Yes	Yes	2.3 EB	Yes	Yes	Yes
JED	Yes	No	Yes	No	memory	Yes	No	Yes; Plug‑ins
jEdit	Yes	No	Yes	No	No (heap) (Note: jEdit: Limited by Java heap size.)	?	Yes	Yes
JOE	Yes	No	Yes	No	Yes	?	?	Yes
JOVE	Yes	No	No	No	memory	?	No	No
Kate	Yes	Yes	Yes; Plug‑in	No	No	Maybe (Note: Kate: Line length is limited by default. The limit can be removed, but long lines may cause poor performance.)	Yes	Yes; Plug‑in
KEDIT	Yes	Yes	Yes	No	Yes	10Kb	Yes	No
Komodo Edit	?	?	Yes	No	?	?	Yes	Yes
Komodo IDE	?	?	Yes	Yes	?	?	Yes	Yes
KWrite	No	No	No	No	No	No	No	?
LE	Yes	No	No	No (Note: LE text editor locks the file and warns if someone else has changed the file)	memory (Note: LE text editor can view and edit large files or their parts in mmap-shared mode)	?	Yes	?
Light Table	No	Yes	No	No	?	?	No	Yes
Metapad	Yes	Yes	No	No	memory	?	No	No
mined	?	?	?	?	?	?	Yes	?
EDIT (MS-DOS)	No	No	No	No	No (64~300 KB)	No	No	No
EDIT (DR-DOS)	No	No	No	No	2 GB, for as long as there is disk swap space for two temporary files	Yes	No	No
Nano	Yes	No	No	No	?	?	?	?
NEdit	Yes	Yes	Yes	No	Yes	Yes	Yes	?
Notepad	Yes	Yes	No	No	memory	?	No	No
Notepad++	Yes	Yes	Yes	Yes	Yes; 2GB	Yes	Yes	Yes
nvi	Yes	No	No	?	?	?	?	?
Pico	?	?	?	No	?	?	?	?
PolyEdit	Yes	Yes	No	No	Yes	?	Yes	?
PSPad	Yes	Yes	Yes	No	memory	?	Yes with plug‑in	Yes
RJ TextEd	Yes	Yes	Yes	No	No	?	Yes	?
Sam	Yes	No	Yes	No	?	?	Yes	Yes external
SciTE	?	?	Yes	No	No	?	No	Yes
SlickEdit	Yes	Yes	Yes	No	Yes; 2 TB	Yes	Yes	Yes
Smultron	?	?	?	?	?	?	?	?
SubEthaEdit	Yes	Yes	No	Yes	?	?	Yes	?
TED Notepad	Yes	Yes	No	No	No	?	?	?
TextEdit	Yes	Yes	No	No	?	?	?	?
TextMate	Yes	Yes	Yes	No	No	?	Yes	?
TextPad	No	Yes	Yes	No	memory	?	Yes	Yes
TextWrangler	Yes	Yes	Yes	No	memory	Yes	Yes	?
The SemWare Editor	Yes	Yes	Yes	Yes Only in special DOS multi-user version	Yes; 2 GB	Yes	?	Yes
UltraEdit	Yes	Yes	Yes	No	Yes (Note: UltraEdit has no real limit on file size - and can easily open, edit, and save large text files in excess of 4 GB! .)	Yes	Yes	Yes
VEDIT	Yes	Yes	Yes	No	Yes	Yes	Yes	Yes
vi	Yes	No	Yes	No	No ~65 MB	?	Yes	Yes
Vim	Yes	Yes	Yes	Yes with plug‑in	memory (Note: 2GB with 32 Bits, on a 64 Bit system it depends on the available virtual memory.)	Yes	Yes	Yes
Visual Studio Code	Yes	Yes	Yes	Yes with plug‑in	?	?	Yes	Yes
XEmacs	Yes	Yes	Yes	Yes	on 64-bit OS (Note: Emacs: 64-bit compilation on 64-bit OS can handle 2 GB files, otherwise the limit is 512 MiB.)	?	Yes	Yes
XNEdit	Yes	Yes	Yes	No	No	Yes	Yes	?

== IDE protocol integration ==
Support of Debug Adapter Protocol (DAP) and Language Server Protocol (LSP).

	Debug Adapter Protocol	Language Server Protocol
Acme	?	?
Alphatk	?	?
Atom	Yes; Plug‑in	Yes; Plug‑in
BBEdit	Yes	Yes
Bluefish	?	?
Brackets	Yes; Plug‑in	Yes; Plug‑in
Coda	?	?
ConTEXT	?	?
Crimson Editor	?	?
ed	No	No
Editra	?	?
EmEditor	No	Yes
Geany	?	Yes; Plug‑in
gedit	?	?
GNU Emacs	Yes; Plug‑in	Yes; Plug‑in
JED	?	?
jEdit	?	?
JOE	?	?
JOVE	?	?
LE	?	?
Kate	Yes	Yes
KEDIT	?	?
Komodo Edit	?	?
Komodo IDE	?	Yes; Plug‑in
KWrite	?	?
Metapad	?	?
MS-DOS Editor	No	No
mined	?	?
Nano	No	No
NEdit	?	?
Notepad	No	No
Notepad++	?	Yes; Plug‑in
nvi	?	?
Pico	No	No
PolyEdit	?	?
PSPad	?	?
RJ TextEd	?	?
Sam	?	?
SciTE	?	Yes; Plug‑in
SlickEdit	?	?
Smultron	?	?
SubEthaEdit	?	?
TED Notepad	?	?
TextEdit	?	?
TextMate	Yes; Plug‑in	Yes; Plug‑in
TextPad	?	?
TextWrangler	?	?
The SemWare Editor	?	?
UltraEdit	?	Yes
VEDIT	?	?
vi	?	?
Vim	Yes	Yes; Plug‑in
Visual Studio Code	Yes	Yes
XEmacs	No	No
XNEdit	?	?

== Key bindings ==
	Custom	IBM CUA	macOS	vi	Emacs	Pico	WordStar	WordPerfect	Brief
Acme	No	No	No	No	No	No	No	No	No
Alphatk	?	?	?	?	?	?	?	?	?
Atom	?	?	?	?	?	?	?	?	?
BBEdit	Yes	?	Yes	?	Yes	?	?	?	?
Bluefish	Yes	?	Yes	?	?	?	?	?	?
Brackets	Yes	Partial	Yes	Yes; Plug‑in	Yes; Plug‑in	No	No	No	No
Coda	Yes	?	Yes	?	?	?	?	?	?
ConTEXT	?	?	?	?	?	?	?	?	?
Crimson Editor	?	?	?	?	?	?	?	?	?
ed	No	No	No	No	No	No	No	No	No
Editra	No	No	No	Yes	No	No	No	No	No
EmEditor	Yes	?	?	?	?	?	?	?	?
epsilon	Yes	?	?	?	Yes	?	?	?	Yes
Geany	Yes	?	?	?	?	?	?	?	?
gedit	Yes (Note: It is possible to customize all Gedit shortcuts because it is Gtk based.)	?	?	?	?	?	?	?	?
GNU Emacs	Yes	Yes	Yes	Yes	Yes	Partial	Yes	Yes	Yes
JED	Yes	Partial (Note: The JED base release comes with a basic CUA emulation, but it doesn't bother to bind lots of useful editor features. Also, like some other editors, 1 side of a region must be at the cursor. The main extension collections jedmodes/jed-extra and the "Red Project" have improved versions, tackling the former problem in particular.)	?	Yes	Yes	?	Yes	?	Yes
jEdit	Yes	?	Yes	Yes	?	?	?	?	?
JOE	Yes	No	No	No	Yes	Yes	Yes	No	No
JOVE	Yes	No	No	No	Yes	No	Yes	No	No
LE	Yes	?	?	No	?	?	?	?	?
Light Table	Yes	Partial	?	Yes; Plug‑in	Yes; Plug‑in	?	?	?	?
Kate	Yes	No	No	Yes	No	No	No	No	No
KEDIT	Yes	Yes	No	No	No	No	No	No	No
Komodo Edit	Yes	?	Yes	Yes	Yes	?	?	?	?
Komodo IDE	Yes	?	Yes	Yes	Yes	?	?	?	?
KWrite	Yes	?	?	?	?	?	?	?	?
Metapad	?	?	?	?	?	?	?	?	?
mined	?	?	?	?	Yes	Yes	Yes	?	?
MS-DOS Editor	No	No	No	No	No	No	No	No	No
Nano	Yes	No	No	No	Partial	Yes	No	No	No
NEdit	Yes	?	?	?	?	?	?	?	?
Notepad	No	Yes	No	No	No	No	No	No	No
Notepad++	Partial	Yes	No	No	No	No	No	No	No
nvi	?	?	?	Yes	?	?	?	?	?
Pico	No	No	No	No	Partial	Yes	No	No	No
PolyEdit	?	?	?	?	?	?	?	?	?
PSPad	Yes	?	?	?	?	?	?	?	?
RJ TextEd	Yes	?	?	?	?	?	?	?	?
Sam	No	No	No	No	No	No	No	No	No
SciTE	Partial (Note: In SciTE, custom keystrokes may be assigned to Lua scripts, external programs or lexers (highlighters).)	?	?	No	No	No	?	?	?
SlickEdit	Yes (Note: SlickEdit provides emulation of Visual Studio, Visual C++ 6, CodeWright, Epsilon and ISPF key bindings in addition to those given in the table.)	Yes	Yes (Note: SlickEdit supports CodeWarrior, Xcode and BBEdit key binding emulation.)	Partial (Note: SlickEdit includes support of vi key bindings, the ex command line and some, but not all Vim extensions.)	Yes	No	No	No	Yes
Smultron	?	?	?	?	?	?	?	?	?
SubEthaEdit	No	No	Yes	No	No	No	No	No	No
TED Notepad	?	?	?	?	?	?	?	?	?
TextEdit	No	No	Yes	No	No	No	No	No	No
TextMate	No	No	Yes	No	No	No	No	No	No
TextPad	Yes	?	?	?	?	?	?	?	?
TextWrangler	Yes	?	Yes	No	Yes	No	?	?	?
The SemWare Editor	Yes	?	?	?	?	?	?	?	?
UltraEdit	Yes	?	No	?	?	?	?	?	?
VEDIT	Yes	Yes	No	No	No	No	Yes	Yes	Yes
vi	Yes	No	No	Yes	No	No	No	No	No
Vim	Partial	Yes; Plug‑in	Yes; Plug‑in	Yes (Note: Vim emulates vi keys fully when in 'compatible' mode)	Yes; Plug‑in (Note: Vim With a script)	?	Yes; Plug‑in	No	Yes; Plug‑in
Visual Studio Code	Yes	No	Yes	Yes; Plug‑in	Yes; Plug‑in	No	No	No	Partial; Plug‑in
XEmacs	Yes	Yes	Yes	Yes	Yes	Partial	Yes	Yes	Yes
XNEdit	Yes	?	?	?	?	?	?	?	?

Notes:

Vim
Custom maps of Ctrl-1 .. Ctrl-9, Ctrl-0 cannot be set, nor is Control-Shift-<char> distinguished from Ctrl-<char>.
Notepad++
Custom shortcuts of Shift-<char> cannot be set, they need an added modifier such as Ctrl or Alt. i.e. SCI_LINESCROLLUP cannot be bound to "Shift-I"as the "Add"button is greyed out.
Pico
Pico uses most of Emacs's motion and deletion commands: ^F ^B ^P ^N ^D etc.

== Protocol support ==
	FTP	HTTP	SSH	WebDAV
Acme	No	No	No	No
Alphatk	Yes	No	No	Yes
Atom	?	?	?	?
BBEdit	Yes	No	Yes	No
Bluefish	Yes	Yes	Yes	Yes
Brackets	Yes; Plug‑in	No	No	No
Coda	Yes	Yes	Yes	Yes
ConTEXT	No	?	No	?
Crimson Editor	Yes	No	No	No
ed	No	No	No	No
Editra	?	?	?	?
EmEditor	No	No	No	No
Geany	No	No	No	No
gedit	Yes	Yes	Yes	Yes
GNU Emacs	Yes	Yes	Yes	Yes
JED	No	No	No	No
jEdit	Yes plug‑in	Yes	Yes plug‑in	Yes plug‑in.
JOE	No	No	No	No
JOVE	No	No	No	No
LE	No	No	No	No
Kate	Yes	Yes	Yes	Yes
KEDIT	No	No	No	No
Komodo IDE	Yes; FTP, FTPS, SFTP	No	Yes	No
KWrite	Yes	Yes	Yes	Yes
Metapad	No	No	No	No
mined	?	?	?	?
MS-DOS Editor	No	No	No	No
Nano	No	No	Yes	No
	FTP	HTTP	SSH	WebDAV
NEdit	No	No	No	No
Notepad	No	No	No	No
Notepad++	Yes; Plug‑in for FTP, FTPS, FTPES, SFTP	No	Yes; Plug‑in	No
nvi	No	No	No	No
Pico	No	No	No	No
PolyEdit	No	No	No	No
PSPad	Yes	No	No	No
RJ TextEd	Yes; FTP, SFTP	No	Yes	No
Sam	No	No	No	No
SciTE	No	No	No	No
SlickEdit	Yes	Yes	Yes	No
Smultron	Yes	?	?	?
SubEthaEdit	Yes	No	No	No
TED Notepad	No	?	No	?
TextEdit	No	No	No	No
TextMate	Yes	No	No	No
TextPad	No	No	No	No
TextWrangler	Yes; FTP, SFTP	No	Yes	No
The SemWare Editor	No	No	No	No
UltraEdit	Yes	No	Yes	No
VEDIT	Yes	No	No	No
vi	No	No	No	No
Vim	Yes	Yes	Yes	Yes
Visual Studio Code	Yes; Plug‑in	Yes; Plug‑in (limited?)	Yes; Plug‑in	Yes; Plug‑in
XEmacs	Yes	Yes	Yes	?
XNEdit	No	No	No	No

== Character encoding support ==
The following table identifies notable character encodings that an editor supports – can load, save, view and edit text in the encoding without changing any characters. Partial implies that the editor can only convert the character encoding to internal (8-bit) format for editing, some encodings are supported only in some platforms or the editor can only display a character set (such as OEM) by loading corresponding font, but does not support keyboard entry for that character set.

	ASCII	ISO-8859	DOS (OEM)	EBCDIC	UTF-8	UTF-16
Acme	Yes	?	?	?	Yes	?
Alphatk	Yes	?	?	?	Yes	Yes
Atom	?	?	?	?	?	?
BBEdit	Yes	Yes	Yes	Yes	Yes	Yes
Bluefish	Yes	Yes	Yes	Yes	Yes	Yes
Brackets	Yes	No	No	No	Yes	No
Coda	Yes	Yes	Yes	?	Yes	Yes
ConTEXT	Yes	Yes	Partial (Note: when choosing e.g. Terminal font)	No	No	No
Crimson Editor	Yes	Yes	Partial	No	Partial	No
ed	Yes	?	?	?	Yes	No
Editra	Yes	Yes	Yes	Yes	Yes	Yes
EmEditor	Yes	Yes	Yes	Yes	Yes	Yes
Geany	Yes	Yes	Yes	?	Yes	Yes
gedit	Yes	Yes	?	?	Yes	Yes
GNU Emacs	Yes	Yes	Yes	Yes	Yes (Note: GNU Emacs: While GNU Emacs supports the UTF-8 encoding, it doesn't fully support the Unicode standard, since it doesn't fully support the Unicode Bidirectional Algorithm (see comment in the 'Right-to-left and bidirectional text' section below).)	Yes (Note: GNU Emacs: While GNU Emacs supports the UTF-16 encoding, it doesn't fully support the Unicode standard, since it doesn't fully support the Unicode Bidirectional Algorithm (see comment in the 'Right-to-left and bidirectional text' section below).)
JED	Yes	Yes	Yes	?	Yes	Partial (Note: JEDs Windows version comes with a pair of scripts that can convert UTF-16 text files (actually anything iconv can convert) to and from JED's internal UTF-8. The Red Project releases include an enhanced version of these scripts.)
jEdit	Yes	Yes	Yes	Yes	Yes	Yes
JOE	Yes	?	?	?	Yes	No
JOVE	Yes	No	No	No	No	No
LE	Yes	?	?	?	Yes	No
Kate	Yes	Yes	?	?	Yes	Yes
KEDIT	Yes	Yes	Partial	No	No	No
Komodo Edit	Yes	Yes	No	No	Yes	Yes
Komodo IDE	Yes	Yes	No	No	Yes	Yes
KWrite	Yes	?	?	?	Yes	Yes
Metapad	Yes	Yes	Partial	No	No	No
mined	Yes	Yes	Yes	Yes	Yes	Yes
MS-DOS Editor	Yes	?	Yes	?	?	?
Nano	Yes	Yes	?	?	Yes	No
NEdit	Yes	?	?	?	No	No
Notepad	Yes	Yes	Partial	No	Yes	Yes
Notepad++	Yes	Yes	Yes	plug‑in?	Yes	Yes
nvi	Yes	?	?	?	Yes (Note: nvi Gentoo)	No
Pico	Yes	No	No	No	Yes	No
PolyEdit	Yes	?	?	?	Yes	Yes
PSPad	Yes	Yes	Yes	?	Yes	Yes
RJ TextEd	Yes	Yes	Yes	Yes	Yes	Yes
Sam	Yes	?	?	?	Yes	No
SciTE (Note: SciTE can open files in UTF or one single-byte encoding specified in a configuration file.)	Yes	No	No	No	Yes	Yes
SlickEdit	Yes	Yes	Yes	Yes	Yes	Yes
Smultron	Yes	?	?	?	Yes	Yes
SubEthaEdit	Yes	Yes	Yes	Yes	Yes	Yes
TED Notepad	Yes	?	?	?	Yes	Yes
TextEdit	Yes	Yes	?	?	Yes	Yes
TextMate	Yes	Yes	?	?	Yes	Yes
TextPad	Yes	?	?	?	Partial (Note: TextPad can load and save UTF-8 and UTF-16 text files, but cannot use or even preserve characters outside of the system encoding.)	Partial
TextWrangler	Yes	Yes	Yes	Yes	Yes	Yes
The SemWare Editor	Yes	Yes (Note: when choosing e.g. New Courier font)	Partial	Yes; Plug‑in	No	No
UltraEdit	Yes	Yes	Yes	Yes	Yes	Yes
VEDIT	Yes	Yes	Yes	Yes	Partial (Note: Vedit can convert UTF-8 and UTF-16 files to Windows character set and back. Characters not included in Windows charset can be preserved.)	Partial
vi	Yes	?	?	?	Yes	No
Vim	Yes	Yes	Yes	Partial (Note: Vim supports EBCDIC when compiled on a system that uses the EBCDIC character set.)	Yes	Yes
Visual Studio Code	Yes	Yes	Yes	No	Yes	Yes
XEmacs	Yes	Yes	?	?	Yes (Note: from version 21.5.29)	Yes
XNEdit	Yes	Yes	?	?	Yes	Yes

== Right-to-left and bidirectional text ==
Support for right-to-left (RTL) text is necessary for editing some languages like Arabic, Persian, Hebrew, and Yiddish and the mixture of left-to-right (LTR) and RTL known as bidirectional (BiDi). The following table indicates whether an editor supports RTL and BiDi text. Some editors (e.g. Notepad++ 5.1.3) can render bidirectional text but does not support editing it.

	RTL	Bidi
Acme	No	No
Alphatk	?	?
Atom	No	No
BBEdit	Yes	Yes
Bluefish	Yes	Yes
Brackets	?	?
Coda	?	?
ConTEXT	?	?
Crimson Editor	?	?
ed	?	?
Editra	?	?
EmEditor	No	No
Geany	?	?
gedit	Yes	Yes
GNU Emacs	Yes	Yes (Note: GNU Emacs (1) According to a comment in the source file where the bidi support is implemented (http://git.savannah.gnu.org/cgit/emacs.git/tree/src/bidi.c accessed August 15, 2017), GNU Emacs doesn't fully conform to the Unicode Bidirectional Algorithm (Unicode Annex #9, a.k.a. UAX #9) in the way it wraps the lines of a bidi paragraph: "we are violating paragraph 3.4 of UAX#9. which mandates that line breaking shall be done before reordering each screen line separately." (2) According to the online GNU Emacs manual (section 22.19 Bidirectional Editing, accessed August 15, 2017), for the purpose of changing paragraph direction, "Paragraph boundaries are empty lines, i.e., lines consisting entirely of whitespace character". This contrasts with the otherwise ubiquitous convention of regarding the newline marker (LF on Unix derivatives, including macOS, and CR+LF on Windows) as the paragraph separator in plain text documents. However starting with version 26.0.50, the bidi paragraph separator can be customized.)
JED	?	?
jEdit	No	No
JOE	?	?
JOVE	No	No
LE	?	?
Kate	Yes	Yes
KEDIT	No	No
Komodo Edit	No	No
Komodo IDE	No	No
KWrite	?	?
Metapad	?	?
MS-DOS Editor	?	?
mined	Yes (Note: mined: supports bidi in cooperation with bidi terminal (mlterm, mintty); also supports "poor man's bidi mode"(automatic visual text order right-to-left input) in normal terminal)	Yes
Nano	?	?
NEdit	No	No
Notepad	Yes	Yes
Notepad++	Yes	Partial (Note: Notepadpp: Scintilla (Notepad++'s Engine) does not really support bidirectional editing ... Some bidirectional text support added in 4.1.0. https://sourceforge.net/p/scintilla/bugs/757/#01c9)
nvi	?	?
Pico	?	?
PolyEdit	?	?
PSPad	?	?
RJ TextEd	Yes	Yes
Sam	No	No
SciTE	No	No
SlickEdit	?	?
Smultron	?	?
SubEthaEdit	Yes	Yes
TED Notepad	?	?
TextEdit	Yes	Yes
TextMate	No	No
TextPad	?	?
TextWrangler	Yes	Yes
The SemWare Editor	No	No
UltraEdit	No	No
VEDIT	?	?
vi	?	?
Vim	Yes	Yes through terminal support
Visual Studio Code	No	Yes
XEmacs	?	?
XNEdit	No	No

== Newline support ==
The following table identifies newline support of editors. The three options are:

CR/LF
Generally, used on Windows.
LF
Generally, used on Unix-like systems (including macOS).
CR
Generally, used on Classic Mac OS.

	CR/LF	LF	CR
Acme	Yes	Yes	Yes
Alphatk	Yes	Yes	Yes
Atom	Yes	Yes	No
BBEdit	Yes	Yes	Yes
Bluefish	Yes	Yes	Yes
Brackets	Yes	Yes	No
Coda	Yes	Yes	Yes
ConTEXT	Yes	Yes	Yes
Crimson Editor	Yes	Yes	Yes
ed	No	Yes	No
Editra	Yes	Yes	Yes
EmEditor	Yes	Yes	Yes
Geany	Yes	Yes	Yes
gedit	Yes	Yes	Yes
GNU Emacs (Note: GNU Emacs: GNU Emacs doesn't regard the newline marker as a paragraph separator in bidi texts. See comment in the 'Right-to-left and bidirectional text' section.)	Yes	Yes	Yes
JED	Yes	Yes	Yes
jEdit	Yes	Yes	Yes
JOE	Yes	Yes	No
JOVE	Yes	Yes	Yes
Kate	Yes	Yes	Yes
KEDIT	Yes	Yes	Yes
Komodo Edit	Yes	Yes	Yes
Komodo IDE	Yes	Yes	Yes
KWrite	Yes	Yes	Yes
LE	Yes	Yes	No
Metapad	Yes	Yes	?
MS-DOS Editor	Yes	No	No
mined	Yes	Yes	Yes
Nano	Yes	Yes	Yes
NEdit	Yes	Yes	Yes
Notepad	Yes	No	No
Notepad++	Yes	Yes	Yes
nvi	?	Yes	?
Pico	Yes	Yes	Yes
PolyEdit	Yes	Yes	Yes
PSPad	Yes	Yes	Yes
RJ TextEd	Yes	Yes	Yes
Sam	?	?	?
SciTE	Yes	Yes	Yes
SlickEdit	Yes	Yes	Yes
Smultron	Yes	Yes	Yes
SubEthaEdit	Yes	Yes	Yes
Sublime Text	Yes	Yes	Yes
TED Notepad	Yes	Yes	Yes
TextEdit	Yes	Yes	Yes
TextMate	Yes	Yes	Yes
TextPad	Yes	Yes	Yes
TextWrangler	Yes	Yes	Yes
The SemWare Editor	Yes	Yes	Yes
UltraEdit	Yes	Yes	Yes
VEDIT	Yes	Yes	Yes
vi	No	Yes	No
Vim	Yes	Yes	Yes
Visual Studio Code	Yes	Yes	Yes
XEmacs	Yes	Yes	Yes
XNEdit	Yes	Yes	Yes

== See also ==
- Editor war
- Comparison of word processor programs
- Comparison of integrated development environments
- Comparison of HTML editors
- Comparison of TeX editors
- Comparison of hex editors
- Comparison of note-taking software
- Comparison of wiki software
- List of text editors
- List of wiki software
- List of personal information managers
- Outliner
