= Emmet (software) =

Set of text editor plug-ins for faster coding

- Developer: emmetio
- Written in: TypeScript, JavaScript
- License: MIT Licence
- Website: emmet.io
- Repository: github.com/emmetio/emmet

Emmet (formerly Zen Coding) is a set of plug-ins for text editors that allows for high-speed coding and editing in HTML, XML, XSLT, and other structured code formats via content assist. The project was started by Vadim Makeev in 2008 and continues to be actively developed by Sergey Chikuyonok and Emmet users. Since 2015, Mikael Geletsyan is responsible for UX at Emmet. The tools have been incorporated into several popular text editors, as well as some plug-ins developed by the Emmet team and others implemented independently. However, Emmet is primarily independent from any text editor, as the engine works directly with text rather than with any particular software.

Emmet is open sourced under the MIT License.

== Functions ==
=== Expand abbreviations ===
Emmet uses a specific syntax in order to expand small snippets of code, similar to CSS selectors, into full-fledged HTML code. For example, the sequence

div#page>div.logo+ul#navigation>li*5>a

or

#page>.logo+ul#navigation>li*5>a

expands into

<div id="page">
	<div class="logo"></div>
	<ul id="navigation">
		<li><a href=""></a></li>
		<li><a href=""></a></li>
		<li><a href=""></a></li>
		<li><a href=""></a></li>
		<li><a href=""></a></li>
	</ul>
</div>

The expand abbreviations function includes several other complex functions, such as wrapping a section of code with expanded code.

=== Tag balancing ===
The HTML Pair Matcher allows users to locate the matching open/close tag for the tag at the current cursor position. Unlike other HTML pair matchers, Emmet searches from the cursor's current position rather than scanning the document from the beginning.

== Text editors ==
The plug-ins for following text editors were developed by the Emmet team

- Aptana/Eclipse (cross-platform).
- Notepad++ (Windows)
- NetBeans (cross-platform)
- TextMate (Mac)
- Coda (Mac)
- Komodo Edit/IDE (cross-platform)
- PSPad (Windows)
- <textarea> (browser-based)
- Brackets (cross-platform)

The following text-editor plug-ins were developed by third-party groups with the official Emmet engine

- Atom (cross-platform)
- Dreamweaver (Windows, Mac)
- Bluefish editor (cross-platform)
- Sublime Text (cross-platform)
- Visual Studio (Windows)
- Visual Studio Code (cross-platform)
- gedit (cross-platform)
- UltraEdit (Windows)
- TopStyle (Windows)
- BBEdit/TextWrangler (Mac)
- EmEditor (Windows)

The following text editor plug-ins were developed independently and with a different Emmet engine

- Emacs (cross-platform)
- IntelliJ IDEA/WebStorm/PhpStorm (cross-platform)
- RJ TextEd (Windows)
- Tincta Pro (Mac)
- Vim (cross-platform)
