= Brief (text editor) =

1980s programmer's text editor

- Screenshot of a sample Brief session
- Original authors: UnderWare, Inc.
- Developer: Borland International
- Release: 1985; 41 years ago
- Stable release: 3.1 / May 16, 1992; 34 years ago
- Operating system: MS-DOS, OS/2, Windows
- Platform: x86
- Type: Text editor

Brief (stylized BRIEF or B.R.I.E.F., a backronym for Basic Reconfigurable Interactive Editing Facility), is a once-popular programmer's text editor in the 1980s and early 1990s. It was originally released for MS-DOS, then IBM OS/2 and Microsoft Windows. The Brief interface and functionality live on, including via the SourceForge GRIEF editor.

== History ==
Brief was designed and developed by UnderWare Inc, a company founded in Providence, Rhode Island by David Nanian and Michael Strickman, and was published by Solution Systems. UnderWare moved to Boston, Massachusetts in 1985. Solution Systems released version 2.1 in 1988.

In 1990, UnderWare sold Brief to Solution Systems, which released version 3.1.

Solution Systems advertised the $195 Brief as a "Program Editing Breakthrough! / Get 20% More Done". Solution Systems closed permanently after the sale to Borland. Brief is no longer sold by Borland.

== Features ==
The original product features contain:

- A Lisp-like macro language; later, a C-like macro language was added
- Completely configurable keyboard
- Template editing and smart indenting for all major micro-compilers
- Multiple undo/redo
- Unlimited file size (restricted only by disk space)
- Program compiling from within Brief, with "go to the next error line" service
- Support for all major popular compilers
- User configurations to support any other compiler with menu-driven setup
- EMS caching for all files and macros
- Mouse support
- Complete edit operations
- Regular expression search and replace
- Multiple windows, including multiple windows on the same source file
- Ability to set extremely high key-repeat rates

=== Brief for Windows features ===
- All the features of Brief for DOS and OS/2
- The first programmer's editor to make use of the Windows WYSIWYG environment
- Color coding of language constructs
- Multitask within Windows environment
- Full use of Windows memory for caching all files and macros
- Ability to spawn off compiles to a DOS box without leaving the editor

== Popularity ==
Both the Brief interface and its functionality had a following, and they live on via SourceForge's GRIEF.

=== Clones ===
Some Vim and Emacs packages provide Brief functionality. There was more than one program written to provide Brief-like functionality:

- Brief Basic
- Brief Editor
- Boxer
- Short
- Terse
- CRiSP
- GRIEF
- SlickEdit
- Zeus

=== Emulators ===
The Brief keyboard layout became popular and was implemented in or emulated by other editors, such as Lugaru Epsilon, by providing a remapping of the keyboard shortcuts and editor behavior; dBase, an early DOS-day database, also copied this keyboard mapping.

- Borland C++ 5.0
- CodeWright
- Embarcadero Delphi, formerly Borland
- Embarcadero JBuilder, formerly Borland
- JED - by John E. Davis
- Lugaru Epsilon
- Microsoft Visual Studio (Built-in) 6, 2003, 2005, 2008
- Microsoft Visual Studio (via Addin) 2010, 2012, 2013
- Platform Builder for Microsoft Windows CE 5.0
- RimStar
- TextPad
- The SemWare Editor
- VEDIT
- CRiSP Editor Emulator (Emacs CRiSP mode)
- BRIEF Editor Emulator (Emacs BRIEF mode)
