= NEdit =

Text editor for the X Window System

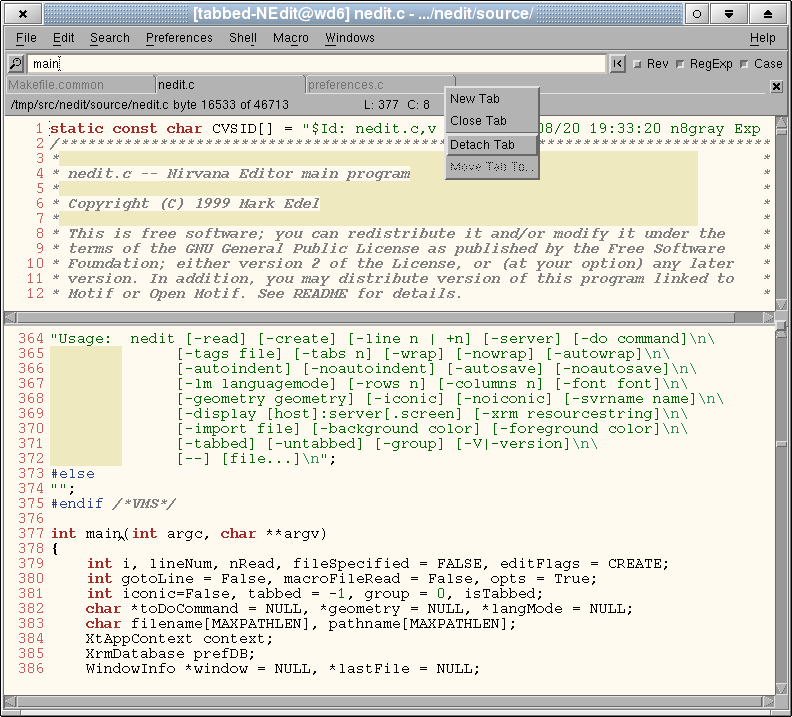
- NEdit 5.5 with tabbed interface.
- Initial release: 1992
- Stable release: 5.7 / 8 February 2017
- Written in: C
- Type: Text editor
- License: GPL-2.0-or-later
- Website: sourceforge.net/projects/nedit/

NEdit, the Nirvana editor, is a text editor and source code editor for the X Window System. It has an interface similar to text editors on Microsoft Windows and Macintosh, rather than to older UNIX editors like Emacs. It was initially developed by Mark Edel for Fermilab and released under a restrictive licence, but later relicenced under the GPL-2.0-or-later (plus Motif clause) and became an independent open-source project maintained by a team of developers. Nedit was also distributed with the IRIX operating system.

NEdit is extensible through a C-like macro language, and it features automatic indentation and syntax highlighting for a wide variety of computer languages. NEdit can also process tags files generated using the Unix ctags command or the Exuberant Ctags program.

Its user interface is built using the Motif toolkit, which made it an immediate success with a wide range of Unix platforms whose user interfaces use that toolkit. For a fully open source version, the alternative LessTif library could be used instead, but more recently the main Motif toolkit was made open source as well.

Major development on SourceForge stopped in 2010, with minor updates being made as recently as February 2017. According to the project's news page the source repository has been converted from CVS to Git in September 2014.

Version 5.6 was released in December 2014, after more than ten years since the release of the previous version, reflecting changes made during the time. This code is based on what was in the Debian NEdit package for some time.

== XNEdit - Unicode support ==
From 2018, development continued on GitHub in the form of XNEdit, a fork of NEdit version 5.7. Version 1.4 offers full Unicode support, antialiased text rendering, modern Open/Save dialog and Drag&Drop of tabs.

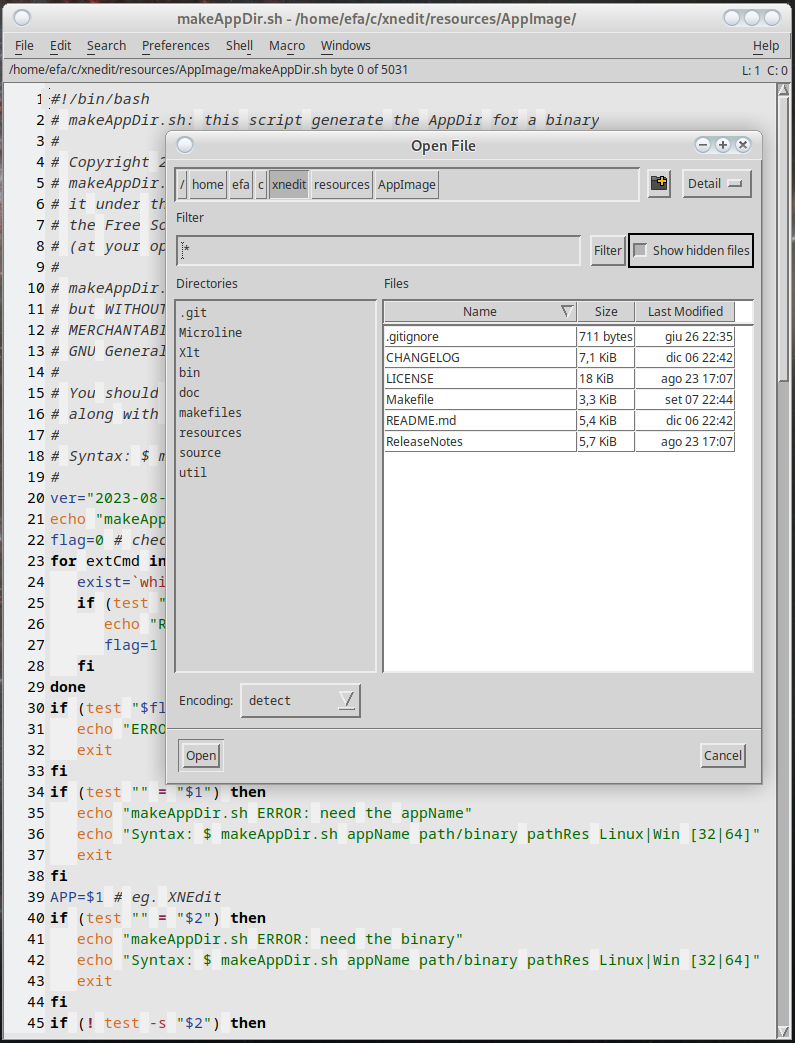
XNEdit 1.5.2 modern open dialog, with clickable path, create directory, file details, hidden files, Unicode encoding selection

== See also ==
- List of text editors
- Comparison of text editors
- List of Unix commands
