= Metapad =

Open-source text editor software

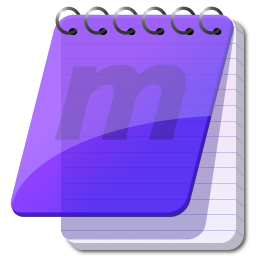

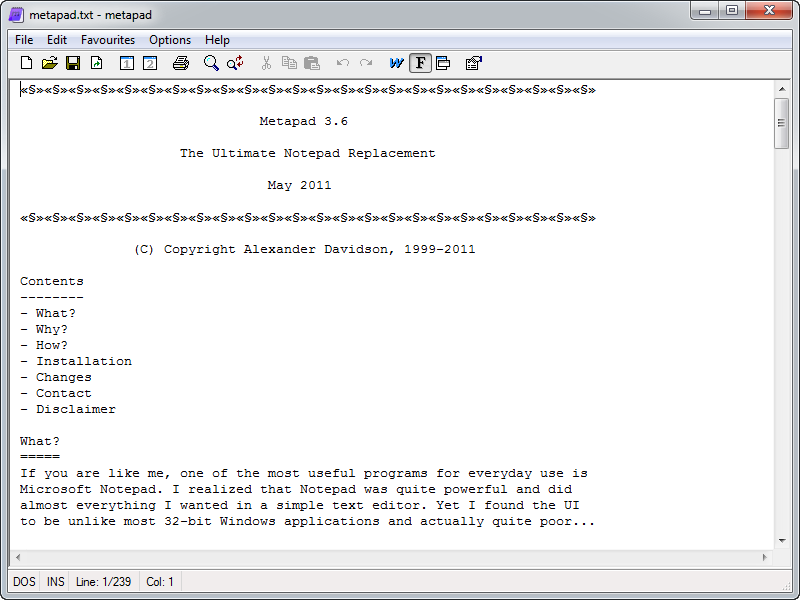
- Version 3.6 screenshot
- Developer: Alexander Davidson
- Stable release: 3.6 / 28 May 2011
- Written in: C (using ANSI C standards)
- Operating system: Microsoft Windows
- Type: Text editor
- License: GPL-3.0-or-later
- Website: liquidninja.com/metapad
- Repository: github.com/alexd/metapad

Metapad is an open-source text editor for Microsoft Windows, developed by Alexander Davidson since 1999. The aim of Metapad is to provide a near drop-in replacement of Notepad in Windows. Metapad was distributed as freeware for the first ten years of its existence. On March 20, 2009, the 10th anniversary of its initial release, the Metapad source code was released under GPL-3.0-or-later.

Some of its key features include:

- No file size limit under Windows 9x
- UNIX text file support
- Commit word wrap
- Tab and newline search
- Hyperlinking support
- Auto-indent mode
- Block indent and unindent
- Toolbar button for always on top
- Language plugin support (though English is British-only)
- Can replace Windows Notepad
- A 'portability mode' to leave no traces in Windows Registry or export your Metapad settings to a new computer
- Semi-translucency mode (early versions)

Metapad is programmed in pure ANSI C with the Win32 API. There are two versions of Metapad: a full and LE (light edition) version. The full version uses the RichEdit control which boasts more features, while the LE version uses the faster Edit control.

== Reception ==
Metapad received 3.5/5 score in a 2013 PC World review, with journalist Mark O'Neill appreciating the robustness of its find-and-replace feature and the ability to quickly exit the application using the Escape key. He disliked the lack of a tabbed interface, however. CNET Download gave it a 4.5/5 score in a 2011 review, with the staff writer proclaiming, "This program should be added to any Windows system, and will soon become the preferred text editor for novices and advanced users alike". Andy Shaw of Web User agreed with O'Neill with regard to the lack of a tabbed interface but appreciated its simplicity overall: "The great thing about Metapad is that it isn't crammed with an overwhelming array of tools. It keeps things simple by only offering a few basics on top of what Notepad provides, such as drag-and-drop editing, a useful toolbar and a favourites list". He gave it four stars out of five in a 2016 review.

== See also ==
- List of text editors
- Comparison of text editors
