= KWrite =

Text editor for KDE desktop environment

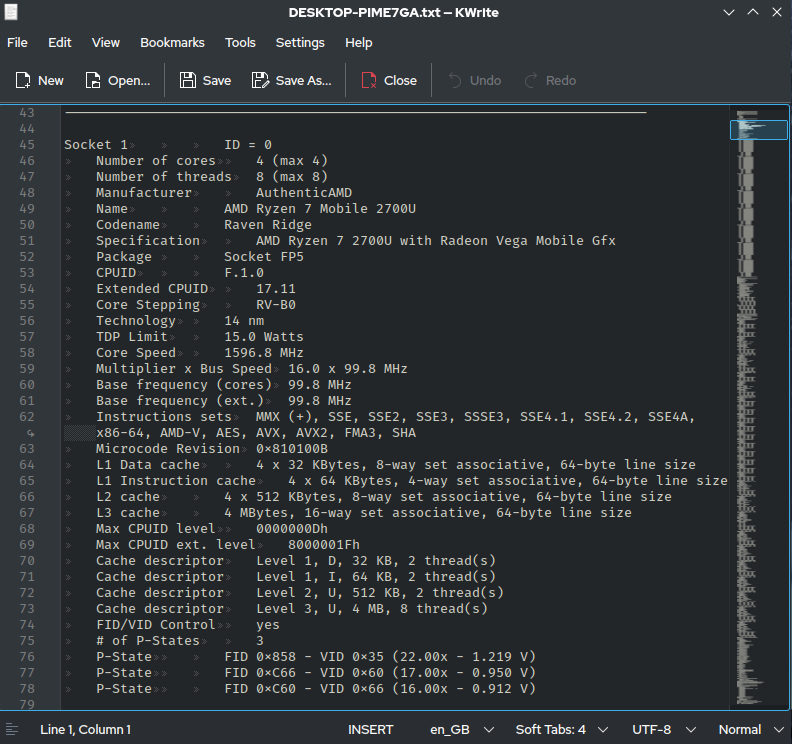
- Developer(s): KDE (Christoph Cullmann, Anders Lund, Joseph Wenninger, Hamish Rodda, et al.)
- Stable release: R14.1.1 / 19 October 2023
- Repository: invent.kde.org/utilities/kate
- Written in: C++
- Operating system: Linux
- Type: Text editor
- License: LGPL
- Website: apps.kde.org/kwrite/

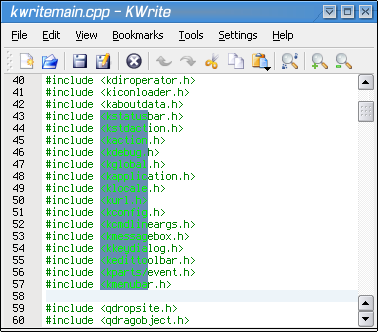
A screenshot illustrating block selection mode

KWrite is a lightweight text editor developed by the KDE free software community. Since K Desktop Environment 3, Kwrite has been based on the Kate text editor and the KParts framework, allowing it to use many of Kate's features.

== KParts technology ==
In KDE 2.x, KWrite did not use the KParts technology, which allows you to include one application in another. Later, KWrite was rewritten using this technology. For example, it allows the user to select Vim to be included in KWrite. Other features include a text editor based on Qt (Qt Designer based text editor) and advanced text editing in KDE (KDE advanced text editor - KATE). The latter is the standard option and is used by the KATE text editor.

== Features ==
- Export to HTML, PDF, or PostScript formats
- Block selection mode (see screenshot)
- Code folding
- Bookmarks
- Syntax highlighting
- Encoding selection
- End-of-line mode selection (Unix, Windows, classic Mac OS)
- Word completion
- Supports Plugins
- Supports Vi input mode

== See also ==
- Kate
- Comparison of text editors
