= Smultron =

Text editor for macOS

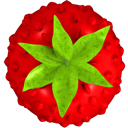

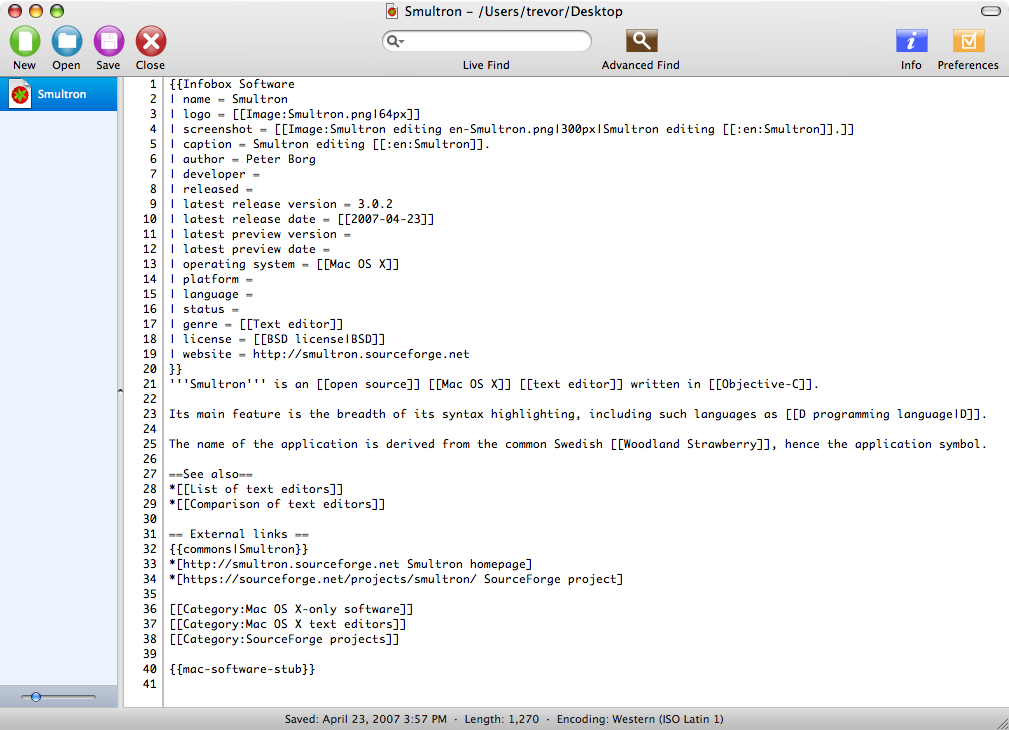
- Smultron user interface
- Original author(s): Peter Borg
- Stable release: 12.0.6 / 3 January 2020; 5 years ago
- Written in: Objective-C
- Operating system: macOS
- Available in: Multi-lingual
- Type: Text editor
- License: 2011 (Note: Proprietary since version 3.8.): Proprietary; 2007 (Note: Apache-2.0 from version 3.0 to 3.6b1.): Apache-2.0; 2006 (Note: BSD-3-Clause from version 2.0 to 2.2.7.): BSD-3-Clause; 2004 (Note: GPL from version 0.6 to 1.2.7.): GPL (Note: GPL. No version mentioned, therefore any version.)
- Website: www.peterborgapps.com/smultron

Smultron is a text editor for macOS that is designed for both beginners and advanced users, named after the Swedish word for the woodland strawberry.

It was originally published as free software but is now sold through the Mac App Store. It is written in Objective-C using the Cocoa API, and is able to edit and save many different file types. Smultron also includes syntax highlighting with support for many popular programming languages including C, C++, LISP, Java, Python, PHP, Ruby, HTML, XML, CSS, Prolog, IDL and D.

== Features ==
Smultron only works with plain text files, without support for images or graphics.

Smultron has many syntax highlighting and text encoding options. It can be helpful in the quick creation of websites, and allows the user to utilize and customize shortcuts for quick coding implementations, snippets and file organization. Other features include split file view, line wrapping, incremental search, a command line utility, line numbers, and an HTML preview.

== History ==
Smultron was created by Swedish programmer Peter Borg as his first open-source project, in order to fix what he perceived as a lack of free, advanced, easy-to-use Mac text editors at the time. Its first version was released for free on SourceForge in 2004, and has since received significant support and feedback from the Mac open-source community.. The name of the application is derived from the common Swedish woodland strawberry, hence the application icon. Lingon, another program developed by Borg, is named after another common Scandinavian berry.

Smultron 2 added a new projects drawer to organize files, and added a tab bar to switch between open documents, in addition to the previous sidebar. It required Mac OS X Tiger, due to its adoption of the latter's new Core Data and Sync Services frameworks. In his review, Giles Turnbull noted that the app could be slow when handling large text files.

Smultron 3 was released in 2007, with better project handling, memory usage, and syntax highlighting. It also changed the behavior of the Preview panel to only refresh when a file is saved, a change which was criticized by Ars Technica's Jeff Smykil.

In July 2009, Borg announced that he would no longer be developing Smultron, due to lack of time. At the time, the latest release was version 3.5.1. In September 2009, Borg released version 3.6beta1 to make the app compatible with Mac OS X Snow Leopard. He also said he would not be releasing "any more versions for the foreseeable future."

In 2010, programmer Jean-François Moy released a fork of Smultron, as version 3.7. It was later renamed Fraise, the French word for strawberry. Also open-source, this fork offered 64-bit support for Snow Leopard (but did not support Mac OS X Leopard), added an auto-update mechanism, duplicate line detection, and other features. Fraise was shortly abandoned.

On January 6, 2011, Borg resurrected Smultron and released version 3.8. He relicensed it as proprietary software, and made it a paid app available in the Mac App Store. Version 3.8.2 added support for the Markdown markup language.

Smultron 4, released in November 2011, was among the first Mac text editors to support iCloud sync, a new feature of Mac OS X Lion. Files could be moved from the local drive to iCloud through a menu, which reviewer Nicolas Furno criticized as "not ideal". In August 2011, Smultron 5 was released on the Mac App Store as a paid upgrade, adding Retina display support, iCloud sync support for code snippets, support for expanding and collapsing functions,

The current version is Smultron 13.

== See also ==
- List of text editors
- Comparison of text editors
