= Crimson Editor =

Text editing software

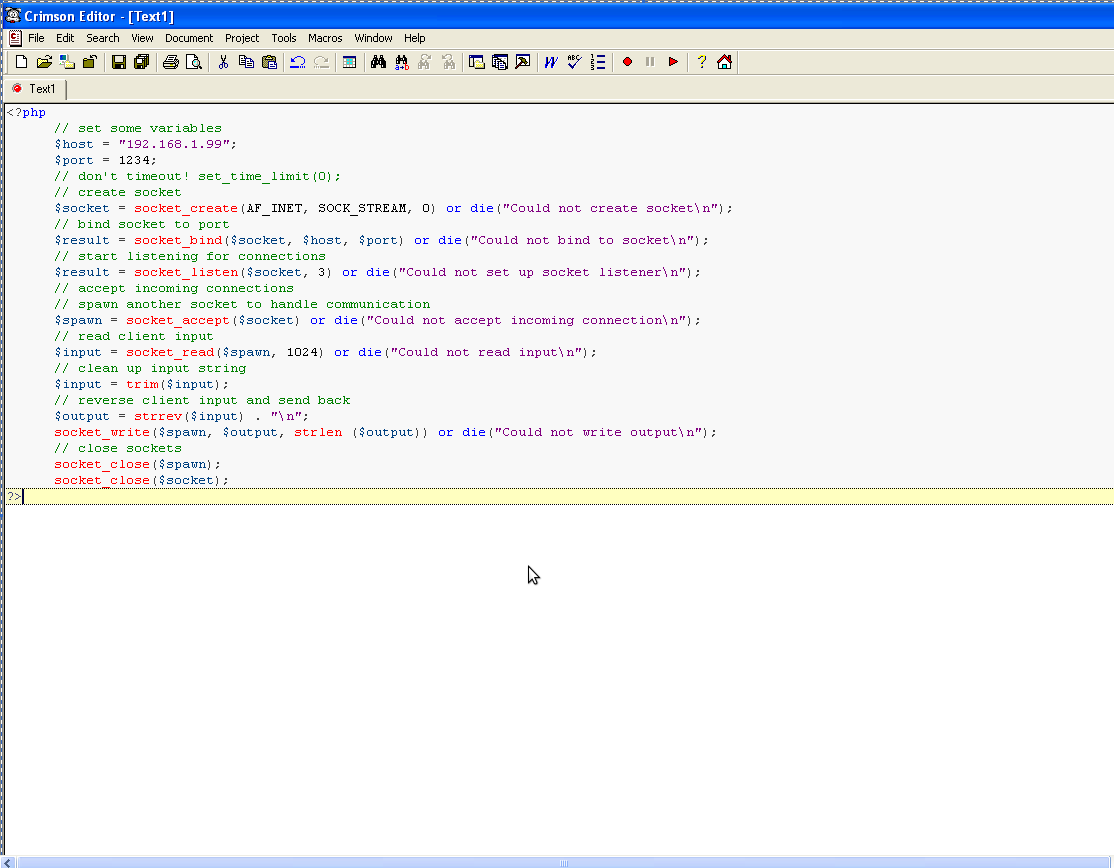
- Crimson Editor 3.70
- Developer: Ingyu Kang
- Stable release: 3.72-r286m / 1 October 2011
- Operating system: Microsoft Windows
- Type: Text editor
- License: Freeware
- Website: www.crimsoneditor.com

Crimson Editor is a freeware text editor for Microsoft Windows. It is typically used as a source code editor and HTML editor. The author was Ingyu Kang.

== Features ==
Crimson Editor features Windows shell integration, tabbed document interface, syntax highlighting, multiple undo/redo, column mode editing, bracket matching, auto-indentation, spell checking, direct editing of text files in FTP and the integration with compilers. Unicode (although only for the characters within the default character set of Windows) and various newlines are supported. Crimson Editor also supports the use of macros. The built-in calculator can evaluate simple expressions. Basic mathematics functions, and date functions are also available. Column mode allows rectangular text interactions.

== Reception ==
Crimson Editor has been well received. It has been highlighted that it has a good set of features, syntax-highlighting for many formats, and includes integrated FTP. However, there are some memory issues with several (full-project) files, and it sometimes crashes.

== See also ==
- Comparison of text editors
- List of text editors
