= Mined (text editor) =

MinEd
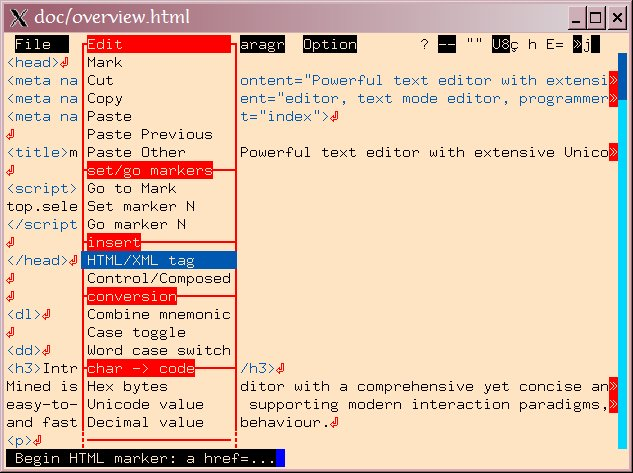
- Mined editing Unicode text
- Developer: Thomas Wolff
- Stable release: 2022.27
- Written in: C
- Operating system: Unix, Linux, Windows, MS-DOS, VMS
- Type: Text editor
- License: GPL
- Website: mined.github.io

MinEd (pronounced min-ed) is a terminal-based text editor providing Unicode and CJK support. It is available under the GPL for Unix and Linux, Windows, MS-DOS, and VMS.

== Features ==
Mined is a modeless editor, with menus and mouse support, and key bindings optimized for intuitive and fast navigation (optionally using control key bindings or various editors).

It fully supports Unicode, including combining characters and bi-directional text, as well as converting to and from a large number of legacy encodings.

Mined also contains functionality usually only found in word processors, such as smart quotes.

=== File management ===
Mined has an interactive file chooser; backup files (optionally versioned), file locking and recovery files which are interoperable with other editors, and file change monitoring.

== See also ==
- List of text editors
- Comparison of text editors
