= SciTE =

Free and open text editor

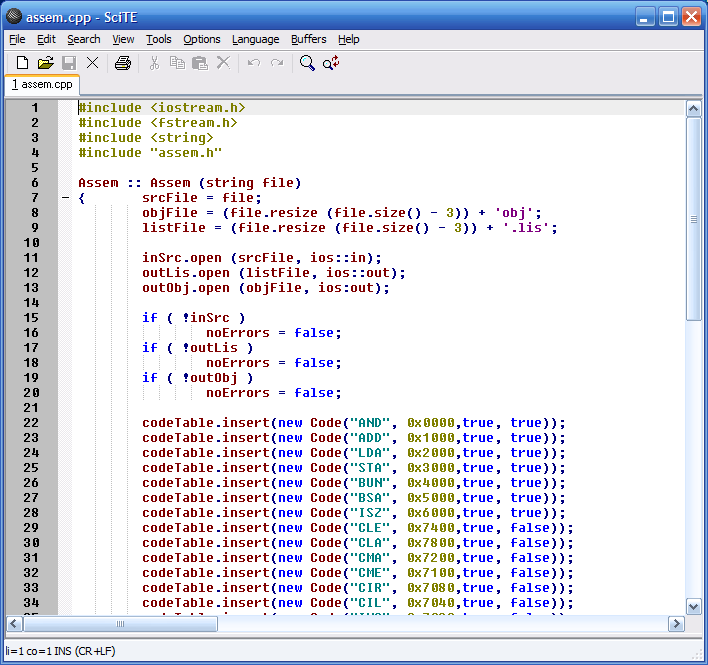
- SciTE under Windows
- Developer(s): Neil Hodgson
- Initial release: 1999; 26 years ago
- Stable release: 5.5.4 / 18 December 2024
- Repository: hg.code.sf.net/p/scintilla/scite
- Written in: C++
- Available in: 39 languages
- List of languages Afrikaans, Arabic, Bulgarian, Catalan, Chinese Traditional, Chinese Simplified, Czech, Welsh, Danish, German, Greek, Spanish, Spanish (Mexico), Estonian, Basque, Finnish, French, Galician, Hungarian, Indonesian, Italian, Japanese, Kazakh, Korean, Malay, Norwegian Bokmål, Dutch, Polish, Brazilian Portuguese, Portuguese, Romanian, Russian, Slovene, Serbian, Swedish, Swahili, Thai, Turkish, Ukrainian
- Type: Text editor
- License: HPND
- Website: www.scintilla.org/SciTE.html

SciTE or SCIntilla based Text Editor is a cross-platform text editor written by Neil Hodgson using the Scintilla editing component. It is licensed under a minimal version of the Historical Permission Notice and Disclaimer.

Lightweight and built for speed, it is designed mainly for source editing, and performs syntax highlighting and inline function reference for many different languages. There is a standalone .exe available for Microsoft Windows, intended for USB flash drives. SciTE shares some features with other editors based on the Scintilla editing component such as Geany and Notepad++.

== History ==
SciTE was first released in 1999.

== Customization ==
SciTE is highly configurable. Although there is no graphical preferences window, settings can be altered by editing plain text configuration files. It is possible to have different settings for each language and project, as well as global or per user options. There are menu options in the standard install to open these files in the editor. These allow a high level of customization over things like shortcut keys, tabbing, code folding, fonts, and syntax highlighting.

In addition, the Lua programming language is embedded in SciTE, allowing the user further customization. One can write Lua scripts that have access to the contents of the buffer and the Scintilla API. The scripts can be triggered by a shortcut key, or on an event, providing the possibility for implementing auto-complete or other hook.

As early as 2003, 21 localizations of the menu texts and support of 36 different programming languages and other code formats was available, and the editor was capable of automatic conversion between line separator styles of different platforms and of detecting Unicode files. SciTE can export plain text files in PDF format.

== Features ==
Features include replace in selection, regular expression replace with subgroups, find in files, code folding, API files, copy formatted, abbreviations, multiple selection, and support for variable width fonts. The editing layout consists of multiple tabs containing source, and additionally an output pane that displays output from scripts that have been run.

SciTE supports syntax highlighting of many languages. The full list of recognized languages can be found in the official documentation.

With version 4.0.5, large file support is possible.

With version 4.1.0, it has experimental support for right-to-left languages, like Arabic.

== See also ==
- List of text editors
- Comparison of text editors
- Scintilla (editing component)
