= Editra =

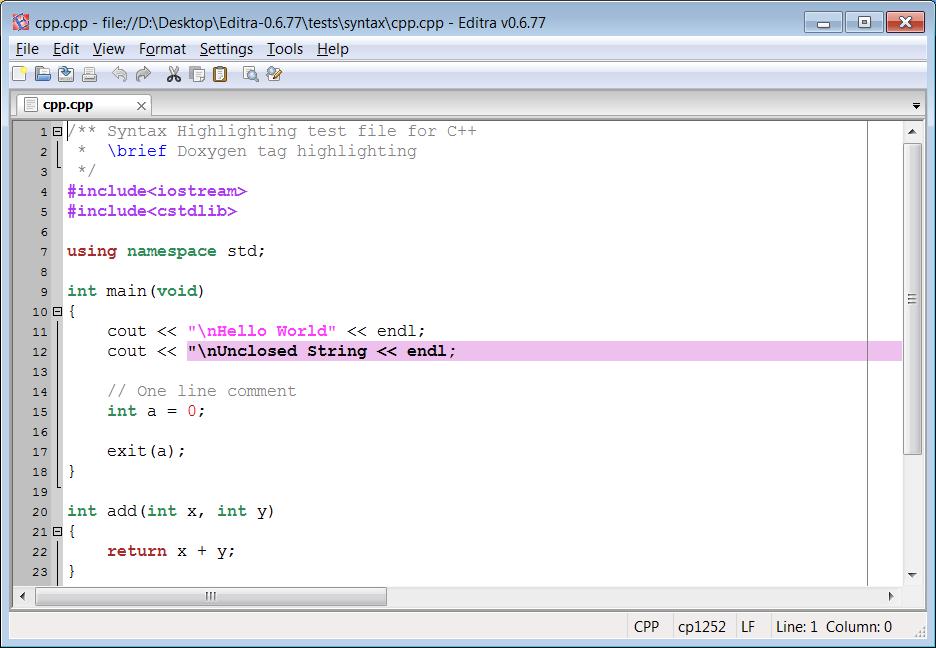
- Screenshot of version 0.6.77
- Developer: Cody Precord
- Release: June 16, 2007; 19 years ago
- Stable release: None [±]
- Preview release: 0.7.20 / 5 January 2013
- Written in: Python
- Available in: 24 languages
- Type: Text editor
- License: wxWindows license
- Website: editra.org

Editra is a cross-platform, open-source text editor, released under a wxWindows license. It is written by Cody Precord in Python, and it was first publicly released in June 2007. As of November 2011 the project is in alpha development phase, but "stable" builds are available for download. Editra has gained notability for being a text editor incorporated in Ren'Py. No builds have been released since 2013, and the domain of the project site has lapsed as of at least May 2026.

== Features ==
It features syntax highlighting from Pygments. It supports many programming languages, including C, Cascading Style Sheets (CSS), HTML, Java, JavaScript, Perl, PHP, Python, Ruby and XML. It also features syntax highlighting for BAT, DIFF, INI and REG file formats.

Editra supports features commonly found in other programmer-style text editors. It also supports:

- Auto-completion/calltips (Python, C, XML)
- Auto-indent
- Column edit mode
- Command mode
- Dockable customizable interface
- Drag-and-drop (tabs/file opening/text)
- Export to build-wxpython.py—build_dir=../bld/LaTeX/Rtf
- Edit remote files (FTPEdit plugin)
- Editable user profiles
- Extensible with plugins
- Integrated Python shell (PyShell plugin)
- Language keyword helper
- Line bookmarking
- Line edit commands (join, transpose, etc.)
- Multiple (synchronized) views of the same file
- Source control management (project plugin)
- Syntax highlighting (60+ languages)
- Unicode support
- vi keybinding support
- Zoom in/out

== See also ==
- List of text editors
- Comparison of text editors
