= JOVE =

Text editor

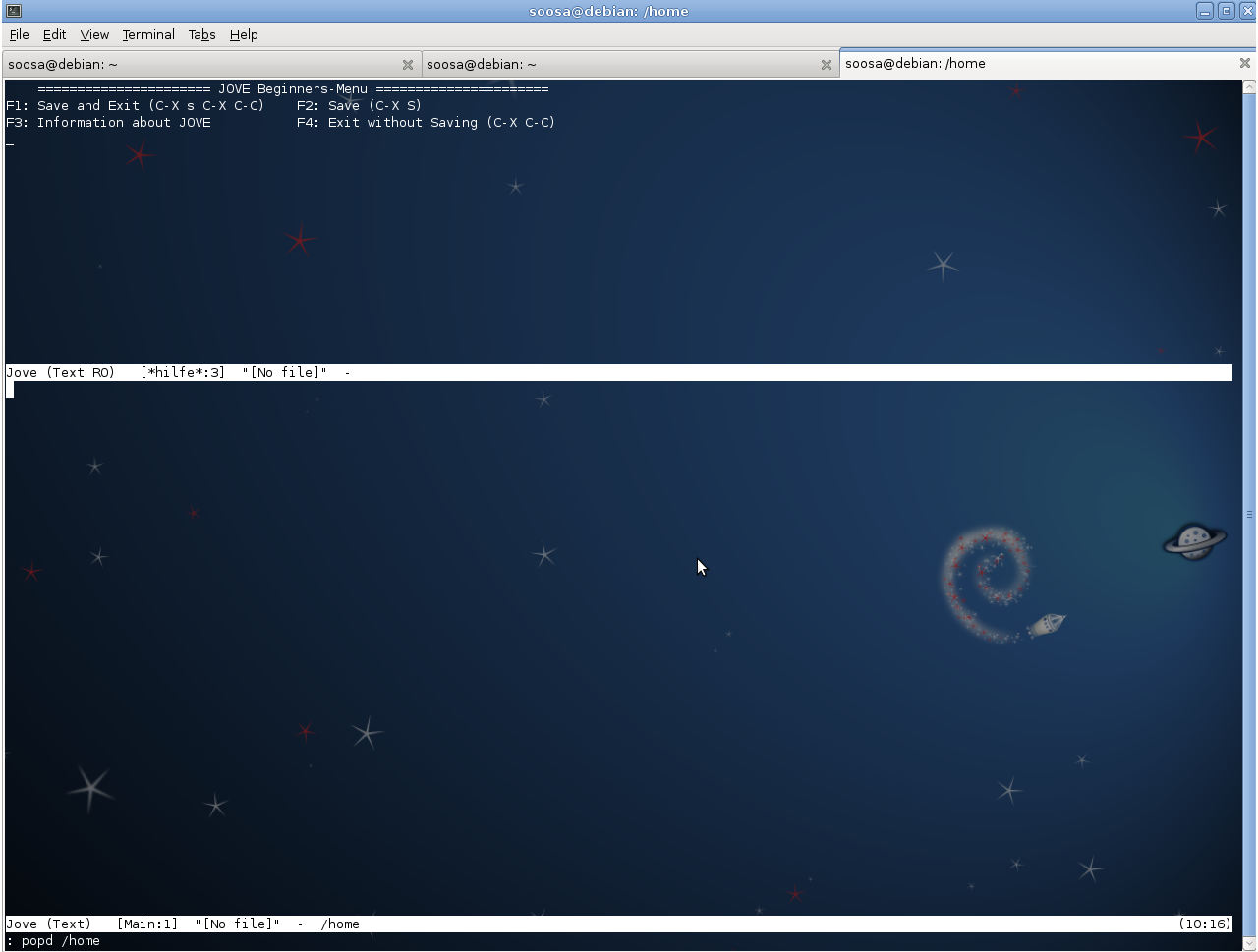
- Jove running on a Debian system
- Developers: Jonathan Payne, Hugh Redelmeier
- Stable release: 4.16 / March 19, 1996; 30 years ago
- Preview release: 4.17.5.3 / March 21, 2023; 3 years ago
- Operating system: Cross-platform
- Type: Text editor
- License: Permissive
- Website: Stable JOVE FTP site JOVE Development FTP site
- Repository: github.com/jonmacs/jove

JOVE (Jonathan's Own Version of Emacs) is an open-source, Emacs-like text editor, primarily intended for Unix-like operating systems. It also supports MS-DOS and Microsoft Windows. JOVE was inspired by Gosling Emacs but is much smaller and simpler, lacking Mocklisp. It was originally created in 1983 by Jonathan Payne while at Lincoln-Sudbury Regional High School in Massachusetts, United States, on a PDP-11 minicomputer. JOVE was distributed with several releases of BSD Unix, including 2.9BSD, 4.3BSD-Reno and 4.4BSD-Lite2.

As of 2022, the latest development release of JOVE is version 4.17.4.4; the stable version is 4.16. Unlike GNU Emacs, JOVE does not support UTF-8.

== See also ==
- List of text editors
- Comparison of text editors
