= Brackets (text editor) =

Discontinued editor for web development

- Developer: Adobe
- Release: 4 November 2014; 12 years ago
- Final release: 2.2.1 / 22 March 2023; 3 years ago
- Preview release: 2.1.0-prerelease / 9 May 2022
- Written in: JavaScript, HTML, CSS
- Operating system: macOS, Windows and Linux
- Successor: Phoenix Code
- Size: ~75 MB
- Available in: 38 languages
- Type: Source code editor
- License: MIT
- Website: opensource.adobe.com/brackets.io/
- Repository: github.com/brackets-cont/brackets

Brackets is a discontinued free and open-source source code editor focused on web development. It was created by Adobe, is written in JavaScript, HTML and CSS, and is licensed under the MIT License. It runs on macOS, Windows and Linux. Its best-known features were Live Preview, which pushes edits to a browser as the user types, and Quick Edit, which opens related code inline.

Adobe released Brackets 1.0 on November 4, 2014, and ended support for it on September 1, 2021, recommending that users move to Microsoft's Visual Studio Code. A community fork released updates until 2023. A separate successor, Phoenix Code, was announced by Brackets contributors in 2021 and now occupies the brackets.io domain.

== History ==
=== Development ===
Adobe announced Brackets in June 2012 as an open-source project, having opened its GitHub repositories to outside contributions in May. Its source code is released under the Expat variant of the MIT License, with Adobe as the copyright holder. The desktop application runs inside a shell built on top of the Chromium Embedded Framework. Adobe also released a commercial distribution of Brackets, Edge Code, as a preview within Creative Cloud and part of its Edge tools. In November 2014, Adobe stopped developing Edge Code, moving its efforts to Brackets.

Version 1.0, released on November 4, 2014, added custom keyboard shortcuts, the ability to collapse Quick Edit results, and more accurate JavaScript code hints. Alongside it, Adobe released a preview of Extract for Brackets, an extension that pulled colors, fonts, measurements and other design information out of PSD files and generated CSS from them. Adobe discontinued the extension on June 28, 2016, citing low usage, and pointed users to the Extract panel in Dreamweaver CC.

In January 2015, Layers reported that Brackets was the 16th most popular project on GitHub, had more than 240 community contributors and averaged about 100,000 downloads per release, and that its users had written more than 400 extensions in the previous 18 months.

=== End of Adobe support ===
Adobe ended support for Brackets on September 1, 2021. Citing its partnership with Microsoft, it recommended that users migrate to Visual Studio Code, and invited anyone who wanted to keep developing Brackets to fork it. The final Adobe release was version 1.14.2, published in April 2020, and Adobe's GitHub repository has since been archived.

=== Community continuation ===
A community fork, Brackets Continued, was set up to keep the editor maintained. Its most recent release, version 2.2.1, came out on March 22, 2023.

The community repository is in maintenance mode, with contributions limited to security patches.

Brackets contributors announced a second project, Phoenix Code, on August 30, 2021. Developed by the company core.ai, Phoenix Code presents itself as the successor to Brackets. It keeps Brackets's Live Preview and web-development focus on a rewritten codebase, and adds a browser-based edition. By 2026, the brackets.io domain served Phoenix Code's website.

== Features ==
Brackets was aimed at front-end developers and web designers. It was optimized for HTML, CSS and JavaScript, and for related languages such as Sass, LESS and CoffeeScript.

=== Live Preview ===
Live Preview updating a page in the browser as the code is edited

Live Preview opens the current page in a separate instance of Google Chrome and pushes changes to it as the user types, without reloading the page. When the cursor is on an HTML element or a CSS rule, the matching elements are highlighted in the browser. For live HTML editing, Brackets serves the project from its own built-in server, which injects the annotations it uses to map the source code to the page in the browser. Live Preview can also load pages from the user's own local server, for example to run PHP, but then only CSS changes update live. Other files reload when saved, and highlighting works only from CSS files.

Live Preview had several limitations. It worked only with desktop Chrome, opening Chrome's developer tools ended the live connection, only one HTML file could be previewed at a time, and updates paused while the HTML was syntactically invalid. An experimental multi-browser mode lifted some of these restrictions.

=== Quick Edit and Quick Docs ===
Quick Edit opens related code in an inline editor within the current file instead of a separate panel or tab. From a tag, class or ID in an HTML file, it shows every matching CSS, LESS and SCSS rule in the project. From a JavaScript function name, it shows the function's body, even when the function is defined in another file. On a color value, it opens a color picker, and on a CSS timing function, a graphical curve editor. A related feature, Quick Docs, shows documentation for the CSS property under the cursor from Web Platform Docs.

=== Other features ===
Brackets can split the editor vertically or horizontally to show two files at once. It provides code hints for HTML, CSS and JavaScript, and its code completion was praised as fast. Early versions checked JavaScript with JSLint each time a file was saved; later versions used ESLint. The Theseus extension added a JavaScript debugger that could set breakpoints, step through code and inspect the values of variables in real time, including in pages open in Live Preview.

Because Brackets is built with HTML, CSS and JavaScript, web developers can extend it with the same languages. Extensions and color themes are installed through a built-in Extension Manager, which draws on an online extension registry.

== Reception ==
Reviewing Brackets for SitePoint in April 2014, before version 1.0, Lukas White called Live Preview "incredibly useful" and described Quick Edit as a "killer feature", though one "some way off from its full potential". He found code completion "really fast". He criticized JSLint running only when a file was saved, which could make the editor "feel a little unresponsive", and wrote that developers working mainly in Ruby, Python or PHP "might be better served looking elsewhere".

When Adobe ended support in 2021, It's FOSS questioned its recommendation of Visual Studio Code, noting that Microsoft's builds of the editor are not distributed under a free license, and suggested VSCodium instead.

== See also ==
- List of text editors
- Comparison of text editors § Programming features
- Comparison of HTML editors
- Atom
