= EmEditor =

Plain text editor

- Developers: Emurasoft, Inc.
- Release: 1997; 29 years ago
- Stable release: 26.3.0 / 7 October 2026; 10 days ago
- Written in: C++
- Middleware: Boost
- Operating system: Windows
- Type: Text editor
- License: Proprietary
- Website: www.emeditor.com

EmEditor is a lightweight extensible commercial text editor for Microsoft Windows. It was developed by Yutaka Emura of Emurasoft, Inc. It includes full Unicode support, 32-bit and 64-bit builds, syntax highlighting, find and replace with regular expressions, vertical selection editing, editing of large files (up to 248 GB or 2.1 billion lines), and is extensible via plugins and scripts. The software has free trial and after that it downgrades to free version, which still can handle huge files and regex.

== Features ==
=== Unicode support ===
EmEditor supports Unicode and provides tools for work with various character encodings. These features include automatic encoding detection, byte order mark support, file reload with a different encoding, and detection of encoding errors. EmEditor is able to use any encoding that Windows supports and converts between encodings with ease. The software searches for Unicode characters while opening Unicode file names.

=== Large files ===
EmEditor is capable of working with very large files. For large files up to 248 GB, rather than opening them in memory, EmEditor "spills them out" into disk space. For files over 248 GB, it uses its Large File Controller to edit separate sections of the file.

=== Plug-ins ===
EmEditor is extensible via plug-ins written in C/C++. The editor's API is available, so that users can write their own plug-ins.

The following plug-ins are installed with EmEditor by default:

- HTMLBar
- Open Documents
- Outline
- Projects
- Search
- Snippets
- WebPreview
- WordComplete
- Word Count

An optional 32-bit plug-in for CSE HTML Validator support is also available.

=== Scripting macros ===
The program is scriptable using the Windows Script Host. The program's scripts are written in either JScript or VBScript. EmEditor can generally be scripted in any scripting language that supports Active Scripting. The program includes powerful macros.

== History ==
EmEditor was first released in 1997 as a lighter, faster alternative to Notepad, which was the default text editing software on Windows. It gained praise for its many unique features, e.g. macros, extra plugins, HTML support, etc. The program continued to evolve, and on the way introduced many more programming languages, such as C++, Java, HTML, Markdown, Perl, and Python. On February 28, 2024, EmEditor introduced ChatAI, a plugin that, as the name implies, lets you chat with AI. On March 13, 2025, they made very dark mode the default color for people with their PCs or laptops set to dark mode, and made ChatAI download separately.

== Awards and nominations ==
- EmEditor Professional has been nominated for the Epsilon Award 2010. Later it won the second place of the award.
- EmEditor 10.0 was awarded a 5/5 Cows editor's rating on tucows.
- EmEditor won the Shareware Industry Award for 2008 in the Best Applications category.
- EmEditor 8.00 was awarded a 5/5 stars Editor's Rating on CNET's Download.com on November 18, 2008.

== See also ==
- List of text editors
- Comparison of text editors
