= Alphatk =

Text editor software

- Stable release: 8.3.3 / 10 December 2004
- Operating system: Cross-platform
- Type: Text editor
- License: Proprietary software
- Website: Archived September 6, 2009, at the Wayback Machine

Alphatk is a text editor that was originally inspired by the Mac OS-only editor, "Alpha", which was written in C, but Alphatk was rewritten in Tcl to run on any platform that Tk runs on: Windows, Unix, and Mac OS X.

Alphatk is most useful for:

- programmers of more than 40 different supported programming languages.
- those writing a lot of TeX or LaTeX documents; and
- those editing HTML source files.

Called "a more pleasant alternative to Emacs", Alphatk has very rich features to aid in writing and editing of the supported files types. As well as being useful for creating and editing such documents, Alphatk provides a host of facilities for communicating with compilers, diff, patch, version control systems, FTP sites, websites, etc.

A large part of Alphatk's functionality is provided by the open-source AlphaTcl library of code. There are several hundred thousand lines of code.
