= VEDIT =

Vedit
- Screenshot of Vedit 6.15.1
- Original author: Ted Green
- Developer: Greenview Data
- Initial release: 1980; 45 years ago
- Stable release: 6.24.2 / January 12, 2015; 10 years ago
- Operating system: Windows
- Size: ~2-6 MB
- Type: Text editor
- License: Proprietary
- Website: www.vedit.com

Vedit is a commercial text editor for 8080 and Z80-based systems, Windows and MS-DOS from Greenview Data.

Vedit was one of the pioneers in visual editing. It used a command set resembling TECO.

== History ==
Vedit (Visual Editor) was created by Ted Green in 1979. It was commercially published by CompuView in 1980 for CP/M operating system running on 8080 / Z80 based computers. When the IBM PC was introduced, Vedit was one of the first applications available for it in 1982. Versions of Vedit were available for MS-DOS, CP/M-86 and CSP DOS.

During the following years, versions were developed for OS/2, Xenix, SCO Unix and QNX. On QNX, Vedit was supplied as standard editor. Vedit was sold in three versions: Vedit Jr, Vedit and Vedit Plus. Later, the first two were dropped and Vedit Plus was renamed to just Vedit. CompuView was shut down in 1989, but a new company, Greenview Data, continued the development of Vedit starting from 1990. The first Windows version (Vedit Plus 5.0) was published in 1997. 32-bit Windows version (v5.1) was published in 1998. 64-bit Vedit Pro64 was published in 2003. It uses 64-bit addresses and data handling to support files larger than 2GB, but does not require a 64-bit processor or 64-bit OS.

Development and marketing of Unix, QNX etc. versions were gradually stopped. DOS-version has still been developed in parallel with Windows version and both have the same functions (as much as possible). DOS version is no longer sold separately or supported, but it is still packaged with the Windows versions. In February 2008, Greenview Data announced that the old CP/M and CP/M-86 versions of Vedit can be freely shared.

With version 6.20.1 (May 2011) the old Windows Help system was replaced with HTML Help system in to support 64-bit versions of Windows (Windows Vista, Windows 7, Windows 8/8.1 and Windows 10).

Greenview Data, Inc was purchased in March of 2017, by Zix Corp. The status of Vedit is unknown at this time, but there has not been an update since 2015.

== Technology ==
The CP/M and DOS versions of Vedit were written entirely in Assembly language.

The Windows version was written mostly in Assembly, but the user interface has been written in C.

Vedit uses its own file buffering which is faster than the virtual memory of Windows. When editing large files, only part of the file is loaded in the memory at a time and temporary files are created only as needed. Thus, dozens of gigabyte files can be open simultaneously on 32-bit Windows.

== Features ==
- Vedit can edit any readable file, including database, binary and EBCDIC files and huge files. The largest file size for standard version of Vedit is 2 GB.
- DOS, Unix and Mac files can be edited and are automatically detected.
- FTP editing allows editing files on remote computer.
- Multiple files can be edited using tabbed document interface or Multiple document interface or any mixture of them.
- Vedit has project support. Opening a project automatically loads all the files, file list, settings and session details.
- Vedit's search function supports both regular expressions and its own pattern matching codes.
- Wildfile function allows you to perform searches, search/replace operations, filtering, run commands or macros on a set of files on disk recursively.
- Block operations can be performed using Windows Clipboard or one of Vedit's 100 internal text registers. Columnar blocks are supported.
- For programmers, Vedit has features such as syntax highlighting, bracket matching, template editing, auto indent, compiler support, function select and Ctags support. Language support can be extended.
- Vedit features an interpreted C-like macro language used to write a part of its built-in functions. It can be used for extending the editor's functionality.
- Event macros
- Vedit can be installed on and run directly from USB flash drive or CD-ROM.

== Documentation ==
Vedit comes with online help and interactive tutorial.
In addition, there are two PDF manuals: User's Manual (449 pages) and Macro Language Manual (305 pages). The manuals are, in addition, available as printed books.

More support can be found on the User Forum.

== Limitations ==
- Current version of Vedit does not support Unicode editing. However, Vedit can convert Unicode files to Windows or OEM (DOS) character set and vice versa.

== See also ==
- List of text editors
- Comparison of text editors
- Wikipedia:Text editor support
