= PSPad =

Freeware text editing software

- Developer: Jan Fiala
- Release: 25 March 2001; 25 years ago
- Stable release: 5.5.1 / 5 February 2025
- Written in: Delphi
- Operating system: Windows
- Size: 7.37 MB
- Available in: 44 languages
- Type: Text editor
- License: Freeware
- Website: www.pspad.com

PSPad editor is a freeware text editor and source editor intended for use by programmers. First released in 2001, this software is produced by a single Czech developer, Jan Fiala, for the Windows platform.

PSPad has many software development-oriented features, such as syntax highlighting and hex editing, and is designed as a universal GUI for editing many languages including PHP, Perl, HTML, and Java. It integrates the use of many project formats for handling and saving multiple files. PSPad also edits UTF-8 encoded texts. Other features include autocompletion, tabs, an FTP client, and a find and replace feature using regular expressions. Another feature is "File Difference" view. It shows three windows at a time. Two windows show the contents of the files being compared in editable form, while a third shows the differences between them. This allows manual resolution of source file conflicts, such as detected by SVN.

PSPad interface is based on the MDI with tabs for editing multiple files and better open document manipulation.

The software is packaged ready-to-run, so that no installer needs to be run, and it is semi-portable.

== Reviews ==
Overall, reviewers seem to have responded well to PSPad editor. Softpedia rated the software with 5 stars, with a user feedback averaging 4.6 stars, and Download.com's user feedback for the software was 4.5 stars.

PC Pro's web site features an article comparing PSPad with multiple other text editors, praising PSPad for its multitude of features and its freeware status. However, the review criticises PSPad's poor performance with larger files, instead favouring the shareware NoteTab Pro for those wanting a 'pure' text editor.

Well Done Software, however, is not so critical of the software, claiming that its programming features, while taking time to learn to use, give a worth-while advantage to work flow. The Czech journalist Ondřej Vomočil described the main advantage of the program as its simplicity for users and the possibility of using it for free.

== See also ==
- List of text editors
- Comparison of text editors
