= JED (text editor) =

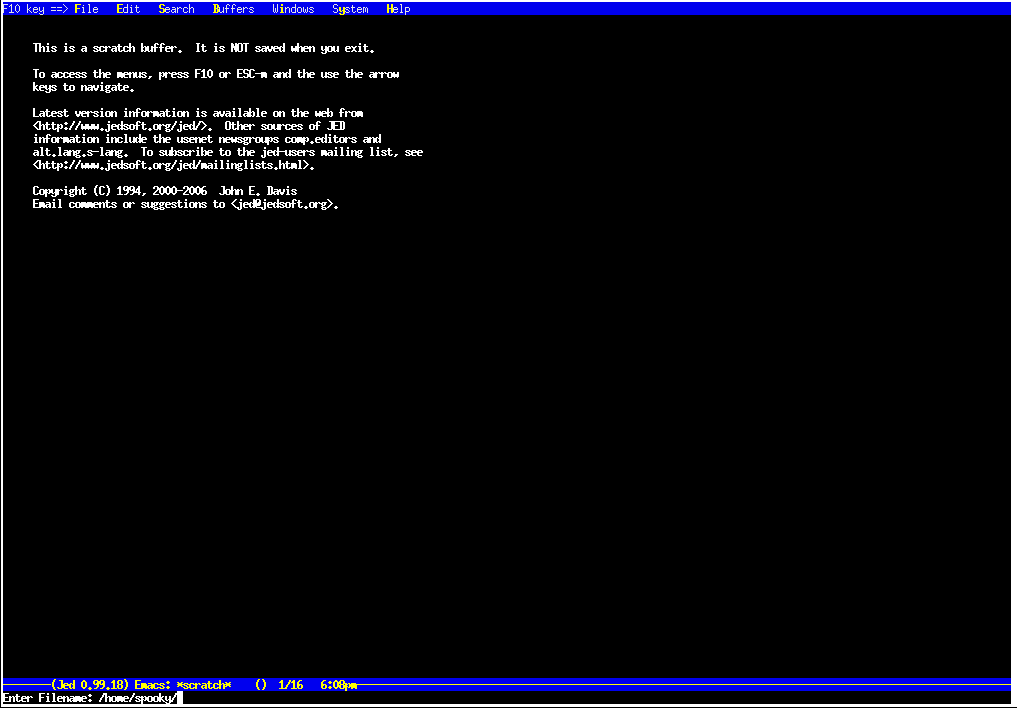
- A screenshot of jed version 0.99.18/Unix
- Original author: John E. Davis
- Release: March 17, 1993
- Stable release: 0.99-19 / December 13, 2009; 16 years ago
- Written in: C, S-Lang
- Operating system: Linux, Unix, QNX, Windows 9x, windows nt, OpenVMS, BeOS, OS/2. formerly: MS-DOS
- Type: Text editor
- License: GPL-2.0-or-later
- Website: www.jedsoft.org/jed/
- Repository: git.jedsoft.org/git/jed.git

JED is a text editor that is heavily extensible by the S-Lang programming language and library. It is available for all major operating systems, among others. JED's extensible nature allows for many plug-ins or extensions, which are called 'modes' in JED and emacs, ranging from programming language-specific keybindings to primitive web browsers. JED's git repository receives irregular updates ranging from months to weeks in between.

== Features ==
From the JED homepage:

- Color syntax highlighting on color terminals
- Code folding support
- Drop-down menus on all terminals and platforms
- Emulates editors Emacs, EDT, WordStar, Borland, Brief
- Extensible in the C-like language S-Lang, making the editor highly customizable
- Can read Texinfo (GNU info) files from within JED's info browser
- A variety of programming modes (with syntax highlighting) are available including C, C++, Fortran, TeX, HTML, Bourne shell (sh), Perl, Python, IDL, DIGITAL Command Language (DCL), nroff, more
- Edits TeX files with AUC-TeX style editing, BibTeX support
- Asynchronous subprocess support, allowing one to compile from within the editor
- Built-in support for the GPM mouse driver on Linux console
- Abbreviation and dynamic abbreviation modes
- 8-bit clean with mute/dead key support
- Rectangular cut/paste; regular expressions; incremental searches; search replace across multiple files; multiple windows; multiple buffers; shell modes; directory editor (dired); mail; rmail; ispell; and much, much more.

Variants:

- "jed" is the name of the console version, whether for the Windows command-box, or for any Unix-like console.
- "xjed" is a thin graphical user interface (GUI) wrapper for X Window System (X).
- "wjed" is a thin GUI wrapper for MS Windows.
