= TextPad =

Text editor by Helios Software Solutions

- Developer: Helios Software Solutions
- Release: 1992; 34 years ago
- Stable release: 9.9.8 / 16 August 2026
- Operating system: Windows
- Size: ~16 MB
- Type: Text editor
- License: Proprietary
- Website: textpad.com

TextPad is a text editor for Microsoft Windows developed by Helios Software Solutions and in its ninth major version. TextPad was released in 1992 as shareware, with users requested to pay a registration fee to support future development. As of 1996 the company was an associate member of the Association of Shareware Professionals. By 1998 the company was pointing out that the editor was "shareware (try before you buy)" and payment was necessary to continue to use it.

== Features ==
Key features include:

- The ability to maintain block indents
- Automatic code indentation (see indent style)
- Regular expression based search and replace, including multiline regex
- Block selection (by columns) and editing
- Macro recording feature to facilitate complex text transformations and data processing.
  - Macro feature supports multiple regex searches (and replacements) within a macro
- Syntax highlighting (extendable to many different languages)
- Ability to call external programs (such as compilers)
  - Regex matching can be used to jump to a line number in a file given in the output from external programs (e.g. to locate the cause of a compiler error)
  - Automatic integration with Java JDK, if JDK is already on the machine
- Large file support
- Support for editing multiple files, with tabbed document selection
- Block select mode
- Synchronized scrolling of multiple files
- Clip libraries – snippet management for reusable portions of text to insert into documents
- Clipboard history – Allowing TextPad to function as a multiple clipboard tool
- Bookmarking of lines, therefore allowing users to copy specific lines (e.g. log file error messages), and then paste them to another document.
- Multi-lingual support: User interface is available in seven languages with spelling dictionaries available in ten languages.

=== Clip Library ===
The Clip Library is a TextPad sidebar that allows users to store small items persistently, and then use them easily. In other editors such as Komodo, a clip library is known as "snippets".

There are clip libraries available.

== Reception ==
TextPad has received generally favorable reviews. In 2015 Mike Williams of PC Advisor called it "an excellent Notepad replacement with a stack of essential features." Download.com described it in 2014 as an affordable editor suited for coding, "neither the most powerful nor most expensive shareware text tool, though many users will find it more than meets their needs at a fraction of the cost of similar tools."

== See also ==
- Comparison of text editors
- List of text editors
