= Light Table (software) =

Text editor and IDE

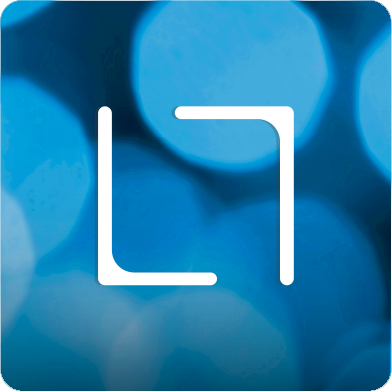
- Original authors: Chris Granger; Robert Attorri
- Developer: Kodowa
- Release: 12 April 2012; 14 years ago
- Final release: 0.8.1 / 22 January 2016; 10 years ago
- Written in: ClojureScript
- Type: Integrated development environment
- License: 2014 (Note: 2014-11-06: MIT since version 0.7.0): MIT; 2014 (Note: 2014-01-08: GPL-3.0-only from version 0.6.1 to 0.6.7.): GPL-3.0-only; 2012 (Note: Proprietary from 2012 to version 0.6.0.): Proprietary
- Website: lighttable.com
- Repository: github.com/LightTable/LightTable

Light Table is a discontinued integrated development environment for software engineering developed by Chris Granger and Robert Attorri. It features real-time feedback allowing instant execution, debugging and access to documentation. The instant feedback provides an execution environment intended to help developing abstractions.

The development team attempted to create a program which shows the programmer what the effects of their additions are in real-time, rather than requiring them to work out the effects as they write the code. Though the program began by supporting only Clojure, it has since aimed to support Python and JavaScript. The developers claim that the software can reduce programming time by up to 20%.

It was financed by a Kickstarter fundraising campaign and subsequently backed by Y Combinator. The Kickstarter campaign aimed to raise 200,000 US$ and finished with 316,720 US$.

== See also ==
- Interactive programming
- Literate programming
