= UltraEdit =

Text and hex editor

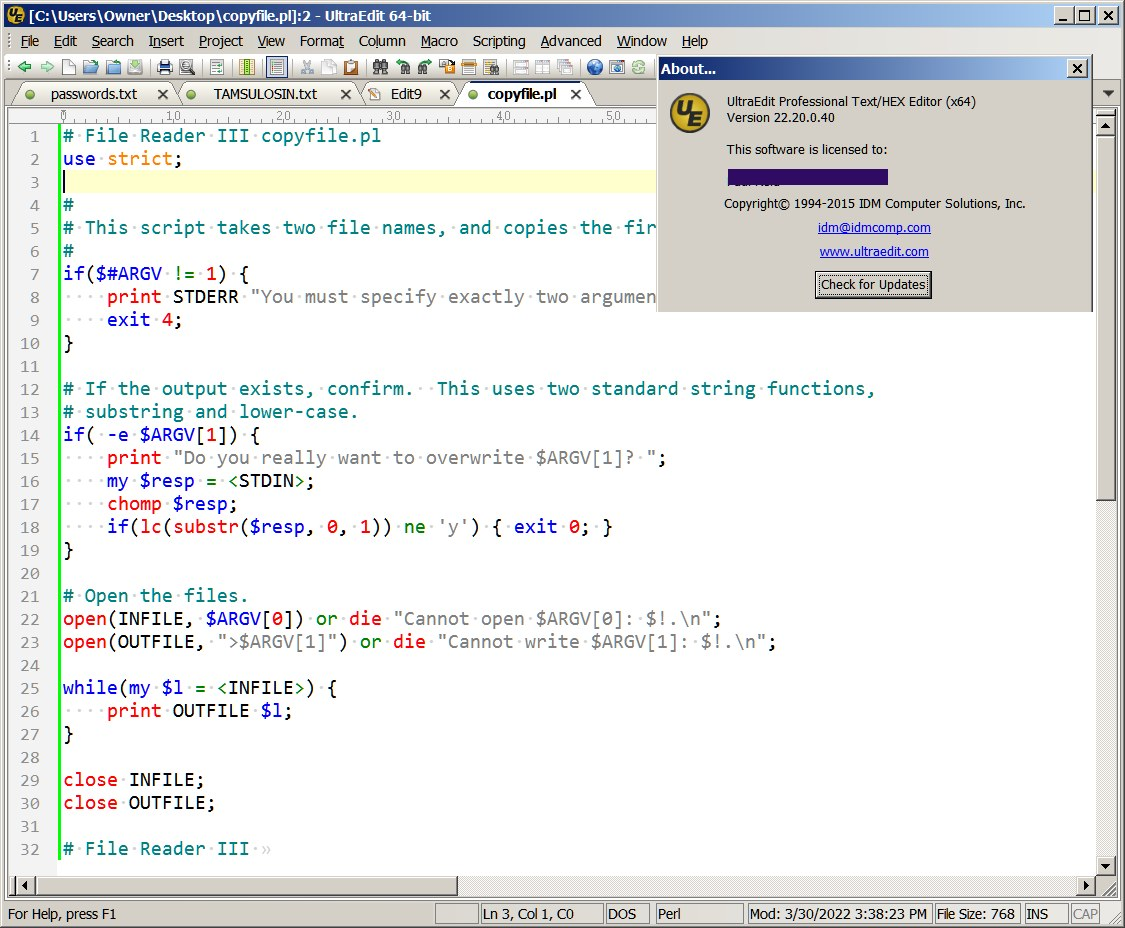
- UltraEdit version 22.20
- Original author: Ian D. Mead
- Developer: Idera, Inc.
- Release: 1994; 32 years ago
- Operating system: Windows, macOS, Linux
- Type: Text editor, source-code editor, hex editor
- License: Proprietary, commercial
- Website: www.ultraedit.com/products/ultraedit/

UltraEdit is a commercial text editor, source-code editor, and hex editor for Windows, macOS, and Linux. It was first released in 1994 by Ian D. Mead, founder of IDM Computer Solutions, and was acquired by Idera, Inc. in August 2021.

UltraEdit is designed for general-purpose text and code editing as well as workloads involving large files, structured data, binary files, logs, and remote files. Its features include disk-based large-file editing, advanced search and replace, column and block editing, syntax highlighting, hexadecimal editing, scripting, Git integration, file comparison, and support for FTP, SFTP, and FTPS.

== History ==
UltraEdit was created by programmer Ian D. Mead in 1994. The program was originally named MEDIT and began as a personal programming project for Windows 3.1. Mead distributed the first version through CompuServe as shareware.

UltraEdit was initially a 16-bit Windows application. A 32-bit edition, known as UltraEdit-32, was subsequently developed for Windows NT and Windows 95. A native 64-bit version followed as desktop operating systems moved toward 64-bit architectures.

During the following decades, IDM Computer Solutions expanded UltraEdit beyond its original text-editing functionality. Features added over time included hexadecimal editing, project management, syntax highlighting, scripting, remote file access, advanced search and replace, column editing, file comparison integration, and support for multiple operating systems.

The company also developed additional applications around UltraEdit, including UEStudio, UltraCompare, UltraFinder, and UltraFTP.

In August 2021, Idera, Inc. acquired IDM Computer Solutions and the UltraEdit product line. At the time of the acquisition, Idera stated that UltraEdit had more than four million users worldwide and customers ranging from individual programmers and startups to large enterprises.

Beginning with the 2022.0 release, UltraEdit changed from sequential version numbers to year-based version numbering.

UltraEdit
- UltraEdit version 2026.0
- Original authors: Ian D. Mead (IDM Computer Solutions, Inc.)
- Developer: Idera, Inc.
Stable release
- Windows: 2026.0 / July 9, 2026; 4 months ago
- macOS: 2025.0 / June 9, 2026; 5 months ago
- Linux: 2025.0 / August 20, 2026; 3 months ago
- Operating system: Windows, Linux, macOS
- Platform: IA-32, x64
- Size: 27.31–85.49 MB
- Type: Text editor, Hex editor, Code editor
- License: Trialware
- Website: www.ultraedit.com

Development has continued under Idera. The Windows 2026.0 release included an integrated product-assistance interface, expanded FTP compatibility, FTPS performance improvements, security hardening, and changes to search and column-mode editing.

The 2025.0 releases for macOS and Linux focused on stability, reduced CPU usage in specific scenarios, multi-file workflows, terminal compatibility, search and replace behavior, and platform-specific improvements. The Linux release was the first major Linux update in two years.

== Features ==
=== Large-file editing ===
UltraEdit uses a disk-based editing architecture intended to limit the amount of a file that must be held in system memory at one time. Rather than requiring an entire file to be loaded into RAM, portions of the file can be read from disk as needed.

The approach is intended for working with multi-gigabyte files such as application and server logs, database exports, CSV files, SQL dumps, XML files, and other large text-based datasets.

UltraEdit also provides a configurable large-file mode. Resource-intensive functionality such as temporary files, line-number calculation, syntax highlighting, and code folding can be disabled or adjusted when a file exceeds a configurable size threshold.

The program's ability to work with large files has been a feature of the product for much of its history. A 2004 review in Application Development Trends described UltraEdit as a long-running shareware text editor with an extensive range of editing and development features.

=== Security and enterprise features ===
UltraEdit is proprietary, commercially maintained software. The developer describes a software-development process in which source-code changes are reviewed by senior developers and product builds undergo automated security analysis.

According to UltraEdit, each product build is scanned using Kiuwan for static application security testing. Third-party software components are also analyzed using Black Duck software composition analysis, with identified vulnerabilities subject to remediation.

UltraEdit states that text, code, and other file data opened in the editor are processed locally rather than transmitted to UltraEdit's servers. The program can continue to operate without an Internet connection and supports offline license activation for systems where Internet access is unavailable or restricted.

These capabilities are intended in part for organizations operating controlled or security-sensitive desktop environments, where software deployment, network connectivity, updates, and vendor support may be subject to organizational policies.

Security-related maintenance has continued in recent versions. UltraEdit described its 2026.0 Windows release as including further security hardening in addition to updates to FTP, SFTP, and FTPS compatibility.

=== Editing and search ===
UltraEdit supports plain-text, source-code, structured-data and hexadecimal editing. Its editing functions include multi-caret editing, column and block mode, syntax highlighting, code folding, bookmarks, macros, templates, and configurable keyboard mappings.

Search functionality includes search and replacement within files and directories, regular expression support, filtering by file type, search within selected text, and search across multiple open files.

Column mode allows users to select and modify text vertically across multiple lines, which can be used for structured and fixed-width text. Hex mode displays the underlying hexadecimal and character representation of binary data and allows individual bytes to be edited.

=== Development and data tools ===
UltraEdit includes support for syntax highlighting and code folding for programming and markup languages. Additional language definitions can be configured through wordfiles.

The program includes tools for working with formats such as JSON and XML, as well as functions for formatting and manipulating structured text and data. It also provides an integrated scripting engine for automating editing operations.

UltraEdit supports Git workflows and remote file access through FTP, FTPS, and SFTP. File and directory comparison functionality is available through integration with UltraCompare.

== Platforms ==
UltraEdit is available for Windows, macOS, and Linux. The versions share the product's core editing functionality but are developed separately and do not always receive the same features or releases simultaneously.

As of 2026, the current Windows release series is UltraEdit 2026.0. The current macOS and Linux release series is UltraEdit 2025.0.

== Licensing and distribution ==
UltraEdit is proprietary commercial software. It is distributed under paid licenses for individual users and organizations.

UltraEdit is distributed as native desktop software for Windows, macOS, and Linux. The software can be installed and used locally, and offline license activation is available for systems that cannot connect to the Internet.

Organizational licensing includes deployment and license-management options intended for centrally managed environments.

== See also ==
- Comparison of text editors
- List of text editors
- Comparison of file comparison tools
- Hex editor
