= LE (text editor) =

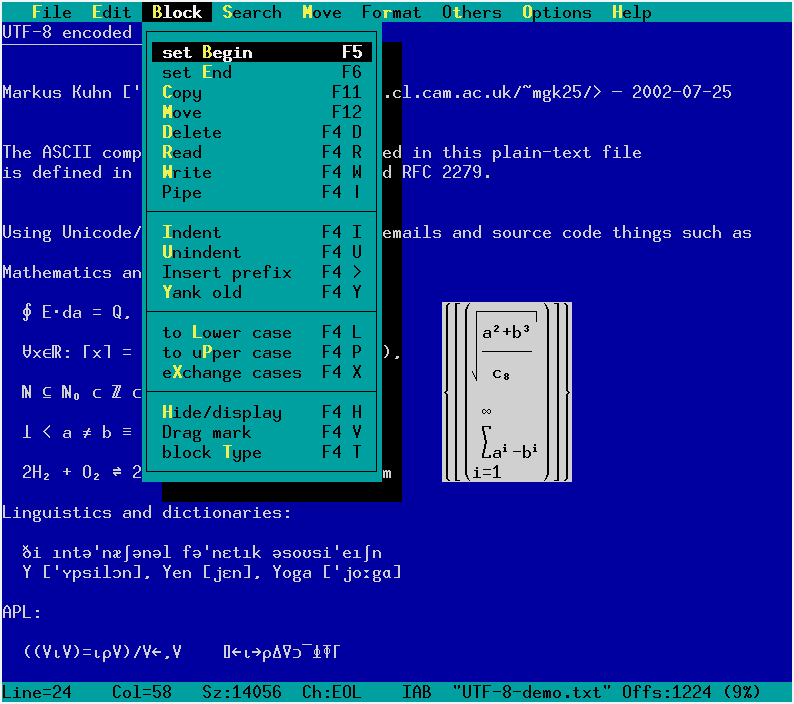
- Screenshot of LE in UTF-8 mode.
- Original author: Alexander V. Lukyanov
- Initial release: 1997; 29 years ago
- Stable release: 1.16.8 / 5 February 2021
- Written in: C++
- Operating system: UNIX-like
- Type: Text editor
- License: GPL-3.0-or-later
- Website: github.com/lavv17/le

LE is a text editor which appears similar to the Norton Editor, but has many additional features:

- Rectangle select/copy/paste (block type is switchable)
- Search/replace with regular expressions
- Filtering block contents through an external program
- Linear multilevel undo/redo
- Customizable menus
- Color syntax highlighting (using regular expressions in an external file)
- Handles UTF-8 characters, based on locale settings
- Customizable keymaps for different terminal types (associating either literal strings or terminfo capability names)
- Hexadecimal editing mode
- Editing of mmap'd files or devices in replace mode
- Frame drawing mode (first seen in Lexicon)
- File selection box (inspired by Turbo C)
- Built-in postfix calculator.

It uses ncurses for display, mouse and part of the keyboard handling. The application has a built-in table of key assignments for xterm, rxvt and some less familiar terminal types.

== History ==
According to the HISTORY file in its sources, Alexander V. Lukyanov started writing it in 1993 while using a BESTA machine. Over the next four years, he rewrote it into C++, and published it in 1997 under the GNU General Public License.
