= RJ TextEd =

Text and source code editor

- Developer: Rickard Johansson
- Stable release: 15.63 / 29 September 2022
- Written in: Delphi XE6
- Operating system: Microsoft Windows
- Size: ~49 MB
- Type: Text editor
- License: Freeware
- Website: http://www.rj-texted.se/

RJ TextEd is a freeware Unicode text and source code editor for Windows, that can also be used as a simple web development tool.

The editor uses a variety of techniques for syntax highlighting in the source. It can use auto completion and hints to assist in editing source code. Previews of HTML/ASP/PHP code are supported. A syntax file editor is included.

The interface is based on the MDI with tabs for editing multiple files and open document manipulation.

TextEd includes a web browser, a file manager, and a CSS editor, as well as various tools for web developers.

== See also ==
- List of text editors
- Comparison of text editors
