= Epsilon (text editor) =

Epsilon is a programmer's text editor modelled after Emacs. It resembles Emacs not only in its default keybindings and layout, but also in the fact that it has a Turing-complete extension language in which much of its functionality is implemented. EEL (Epsilon Extension Language) is a dialect of C rather than a dialect of Lisp. Epsilon runs on MS-DOS compatible operating systems, Microsoft Windows, Linux, FreeBSD, Mac OS X and OS/2.

Epsilon is a commercial product sold by Lugaru Software. It was first released in 1984, long before Emacs was available on personal computers. It was also the first IBM PC text editor to allow editing of files that larger than available RAM, and one of the first to allow running programs (such as compilers) in the background while allowing editing to proceed concurrently.

Epsilon supports Unicode but does not display characters outside the BMP and cannot handle right-to-left scripts. It can convert among dozens of character encodings.

== Reception ==
BYTE in 1989 listed Epsilon as among the "Distinction" winners of the BYTE Awards, especially praising EEL.
