= Coda (web development software) =

Web development application for macOS

- Developer: Panic
- Initial release: April 23, 2007
- Platform: macOS
- Type: Web development
- License: Proprietary, shareware with a 7-day trial
- Website: www.panic.com/coda/

Coda was a commercial and proprietary web development application for macOS, developed by Panic. It was first released on April 23, 2007, and won the 2007 Apple Design Award for Best User Experience. Coda version 2.0 was released on 24 May 2012, along with an iPad version called Diet Coda. Although formerly available on the Mac App Store, it was announced on May 14, 2014, that the update to Coda 2.5 would not be available in the Mac App Store due to sandboxing restrictions. Coda was discontinued in 2020 and replaced by Nova.

== Concept and idea ==
The concept for Coda came from the web team at Panic, who would have five or six different programs for coding, testing and reference. The lack of full-featured website development platforms equivalent to application development platform Xcode served as the purpose for Coda's creation.

== Development ==
Currently, little is known about the actual development of Coda. What is known from Panic co-founder Steven Frank's blog is that Coda development started at Panic sometime in late 2005. Assigned to the project were 5 engineers, 3 people on support and testing, one designer, and one Japanese localizer.

== Sections ==
The application is divided into six sections (Sites, Edit, Preview, CSS, Terminal, and Books), which are accessed through six tabs at the top of the application. Users can also split the window into multiple sections either vertically or horizontally, to access multiple sections or different files at the same time.

=== Sites ===
In Coda, sites are the equivalent of "projects" in many other applications like TextMate. Each site has its own set of files, its own FTP settings, etc. When Coda is closed in the midst of a project and then reopened, the user is presented with exactly what it was like before the application was closed. Another notable feature is the ability to add a Local and Remote version to each site, allowing the user to synchronize the file(s) created, modified or deleted from their local and remote locations.

=== Files ===
Coda incorporates a slimmed down version of the company's popular FTP client, Transmit, dubbed "Transmit Turbo". The Files portion is a regular FTP, SFTP, FTP+SSL, and WebDAV client, where the user can edit, delete, create, and rename files and folders.

=== Plug-ins ===
Coda 1.6 and later supports plug-ins, which are scripts usually written in command line programming languages like Cocoa, AppleScript, Perl, or even shell scripting languages like bash, that appear in Coda's menu bar and do specific tasks like appending URLs or inserting text at a certain point. Plug-ins can either be written using Xcode or through Panic's free program, the Coda Plug-in Creator.

=== Command-line utility ===
Coda does not come with its own command-line utility. Instead, a third-party utility such as coda-cli can be used.

== Reviews ==
=== Coda 1 ===
Coda 1 received a review of 3.5/5 mice from Macworld. It received 4/5 stars from CNET's Download.com.

=== Coda 2 ===
Coda 2 received a rating of 4.5/5 mice from Macworld.
