= List of text editors =

The following is a list of notable text editors.

== Graphical and text user interface ==
The editors below can be used with either a graphical user interface or a text-based user interface.

Name	Description	License
Elvis	A vi/ex clone with additional commands and features.	ClArtistic
Extensible Versatile Editor (EVE)	Default under OpenVMS.	?
GNU Emacs/XEmacs	Two long-existing forks of the popular Emacs programmer's editor. Emacs and vi are the dominant text editors on Unix-like operating systems, and have inspired the editor wars.	GPL-3.0-or-later / GPL-2.0-or-later
Language-Sensitive Editor (LSE)	Programmer's Editor for OpenVMS implemented using TPU.	?
Textadept	A modular, cross-platform editor written in C and Lua, using Scintilla.	MIT
vile (vi like Emacs)	A vi work-alike which retains the vi command-set while adding new features: multiple windows and buffers, infinite undo, colorization, scriptable expansion capabilities, etc.	GPL-2.0-only
vim	A clone based on the ideas of the vi editor and designed for use both from a command line interface and in a graphical user interface.	Vim

== Graphical user interface ==
Name	Description	License
Acme	A User Interface for Programmers by Rob Pike.	MIT
Alphatk		Proprietary
Apache OpenOffice Writer	Word processor and text editor of the Apache OpenOffice Suite, based on StarOffice's suite.	Apache-2.0
Arachnophilia	A source code editor which is successor to another HTML editor, WebThing.	Free software
Atom	A modular, general-purpose editor built using HTML, CSS and JavaScript on top of Chromium and Node.js. The project was retired in late 2022 with the repo archived on December 15, 2022.	MIT
BBEdit	A proprietary text editor originally developed for Macintosh System Software 6	Proprietary
Bluefish	A source code editor with web development features.	GPL-2.0-or-later
Brackets	A modular, web-oriented editor built using HTML, CSS and JavaScript on top of the Chromium Embedded Framework.	MIT
CodeWright	An editing system or source code editor which can be configured to work with other integrated development environment (IDE) systems.	Proprietary
Crimson Editor	A text editor which is typically used as a source code editor and HTML editor.	Freeware
CygnusEd (CED)		Proprietary
E Text Editor	Default under IBM OS/2 versions 2-4.	Proprietary
Eddie	An editor originally made for BeOS and later ported to Linux and macOS.	Freeware
EmEditor	extensible commercial text editor which supports Unicode, syntax highlighting and vertical selection editing, editing of large files (up to 248 GB or 2.1 billion lines)	Proprietary
Epsilon	A programmer's text editor modelled after Emacs.	Proprietary
FeatherPad	A lightweight editor based on Qt.	GPL-3.0-or-later
Geany	A fast and lightweight editor – IDE, uses GTK+.	GPL-2.0-or-later
gedit	Former default under GNOME until GNOME 42.	GPL-2.0-or-later
GNOME Text Editor	Default under GNOME from GNOME 42 onwards	GPL-3.0-or-later
GoldED (text editor of Cubic IDE)		Proprietary
HxD	An editor for huge files, working with both binary data and texts.	Freeware
iA Writer	A multi-platform Markdown text editor with writing focused feature set	Proprietary
jEdit	A free cross-platform programmer's editor written in Java, GPL licensed.	GPL-2.0-or-later
JOVE	Jonathan's Own Version of Emacs	JOVE
Kate	A basic text editor for the KDE desktop.	LGPL, GPL
Kedit	An editor with commands and Rexx macros similar to IBM XEDIT.	Proprietary
Kile	A user friendly TeX/LaTeX editor.	GPL-2.0-or-later
Komodo Edit		MPL-1.1
KWrite	A default editor on KDE.	LGPL
Lapis	An experimental text editor allowing multiple simultaneous edits of text in a multiple selection from a few examples provided by the user.	GPL-2.0
Leafpad	Default under LXDE.	GPL-2.0-or-later
Leo	A text editor that features outlines with clones as its central tool of organization and navigation.	MIT
LibreOffice Writer	Word processor and text editor of the LibreOffice Suite, based on StarOffice's suite.	MPL-2.0
Light Table	A text editor and IDE with real-time, inline expression evaluation. Intended mainly for dynamic languages such as Clojure, Python and JavaScript, and for web development.	MIT / GPL-3.0-only
mcedit	A text editor provided with Midnight Commander.	GPL-3.0-or-later
Metapad	Windows Notepad replacement, GPL licensed.	GPL-3.0-or-later
MicroEMACS	JASSPA MicroEMACS	GPL-2.0-or-later
Mousepad	The default under Xfce.	GPL-2.0-or-later
Multi-Edit		Proprietary
NEdit – "Nirvana Editor"		GPL-2.0-or-later
Notepad	Default under Microsoft Windows.	Proprietary
Notepad++	A tabbed text editor.	GPL-3.0-or-later
Pe	A text editor for BeOS.	MIT
pluma	The default text editor of the MATE desktop environment for Linux.	GPL-2.0-or-later
PolyEdit	Proprietary word processor and text editor.	Proprietary
Programmer's File Editor (PFE)		Freeware
PSPad	An editor for Microsoft Windows with various programming environments.	Freeware
RJ TextEd		Freeware
Sam		MIT
SciTE	Cross-platform, multi-user, multi-codepage, multi-language syntax highlighting, area selector, RE find/replace, and very customisable, allowing different font configurations for each syntactic group, user-defined menus and abbreviation expansion.	HPND
SimpleText	Default under Classic Mac OS from version 7.5.	Proprietary
SlickEdit		Proprietary
Smultron	A macOS text editor.	Proprietary
SubEthaEdit (formerly named Hydra)		Proprietary
Sublime Text		Proprietary
TeachText	Default under Classic Mac OS versions prior to 7.5.	Proprietary
TED Notepad		Freeware
Tex-Edit Plus		Proprietary
TextPad		Proprietary
TeXnicCenter		GPL
TeXShop	TeX/LaTeX editor and previewer.	GPL-2.0
TextEdit	Default under macOS, NeXTSTEP, and GNUstep.	BSD-3-Clause
TextMate		GPL-3.0-or-later
TextWrangler	Mac-only editor by Bare Bones Software, sunsetted. Final version released 09/20/2016, replaced by free tier of BBEdit.	Freeware
The Hessling Editor		GPL-2.0-or-later
The SemWare Editor (TSE) (formerly named QEdit).		Freeware
UltraEdit	Text and source code editor with syntax highlighting, code folding, FTP, etc., handles multi-gigabyte files.	Proprietary
Ulysses		Proprietary
VEDIT		Proprietary
Visual Studio Code	An extensible code editor with support for development operations like debugging, task running and version control.	Proprietary
WinEdt		Proprietary
X11 Xedit		MIT
XEDIT	Default under VM/CMS.	Proprietary
Yudit		GPL-2.0-only
Xed	Default under Linux Mint, forked from Pluma.	GPL-2.0-or-later
Zed	Started by former Atom developer Nathan Sobo. Positioned as the "spiritual successor" to Atom.	GPL-3.0-or-later, Apache 2.0, AGPL-3.0-or-later

== Text user interface ==
=== System default ===
Name	Description	License
E	is the text editor in PC DOS 6, PC DOS 7 and PC DOS 2000.	Proprietary
ed	The default line editor on Unix since its birth. Either ed or a compatible editor is available on all systems labeled as Unix (not by default on every one).	Free software
ED	The default editor on CP/M, MP/M, Concurrent CP/M, CP/M-86, MP/M-86, Concurrent CP/M-86.	Free software
EDIT	The default on MS-DOS 5.0 and higher and is included with all 32-bit versions of Windows that do not rely on a separate copy of DOS. Up to including MS-DOS 6.22, it only supported files up to 64 KB.	Proprietary
EDIT	The text editor in Novell DOS 7, OpenDOS 7.01, DR-DOS 7.02 and higher. Supports large files for as long as swap space is available. Version 7 and higher optionally supports a pseudo-graphics user interface named NewUI.	Proprietary
EDIX	The text editor in Concurrent DOS, Concurrent DOS XM, Concurrent PC DOS, Concurrent DOS 386, FlexOS 286, FlexOS 386, 4680 OS, 4690 OS, S5-DOS/MT.	Proprietary
EDITOR	The text editor in DR DOS 3.31 through DR DOS 6.0, and the predecessor of EDIT.	Proprietary
Edlin	A command-line based line editor introduced with 86-DOS, and the default on MS-DOS prior to version 5 and is also available on MS-DOS 5.0 and Windows NT.	Proprietary
nvi	(Installed as vi by default in BSD operating systems and some Linux distributions) – A free replacement for the original vi which maintains compatibility while adding some new features.	BSD-3-Clause
vi	The default for Unix systems and must be included in all POSIX compliant systems – One of the earliest screen-based editors, it is based on ex.	BSD-4-Clause or CDDL

=== Others ===
Name	Description	License
ECCE	ECCE (The Edinburgh Compatible Context Editor) is a text editor designed by Dr Hamish Dewar at Edinburgh University.	Free software
Emacs	A screen-based editor with an embedded computer language, Emacs Lisp. Early versions were implemented in TECO, see below.	Free software
JED	Multi-mode, multi-window editor with drop-down menus, folding, ctags support, undo, UTF-8, key-macros, autosave, etc. Multi-emulation; default is emacs. Programmable in S-Lang.	GPL-2.0-or-later
JOE	A modern screen-based editor with a sort of enhanced-WordStar style to the interface, but can also emulate Pico.	Free software
LE		GPL-3.0-or-later
mcedit	Full featured terminal text editor for Unix-like systems.	GPL-3.0-or-later
mg	Small and light, uses GNU/Emacs keybindings. Installed by default on OpenBSD.	Public domain
MinEd	Text editor with user-friendly interface, mouse and menu control, and extensive Unicode and CJK support; for Unix/Linux and Windows/DOS.	GPL
GNU nano	A clone of Pico GPL licensed.	GPL-3.0-or-later
ne	A minimal, modern replacement for vi.	GPL-3.0-or-later
Pico		Apache-2.0
SETEDIT	A clone of the editor of Borland's Turbo* IDEs.	GPL-2.0-or-later
The SemWare Editor	(TSE for DOS) (formerly called QEdit)	Proprietary

==== vi-like ====
The following text editors provide functionality similar to vi. They are ordered to some extent by when initially developed and released.

Name	Description	License
ex	Originally developed as an extended version of ed, eventually, it was enhanced to support full-screen editing via a visual mode which is what today we call vi. In other words, vi is a mode of ex.	Free software
Stevie	For the Atari ST, ST editor for vi enthusiasts is the starting point for vim and xvi	Public domain
Elvis	The first vi clone and the default vi in Minix.	ClArtistic
vile	Derived from an early version of Microemacs in an attempt to bring the Emacs multi-window/multi-buffer editing paradigm to vi users. First published 1991 with infinite undo, UTF-8 compatibility, multi-window/multi-buffer operation, a macro expansion language, syntax highlighting, file read and write hooks, and more.	GPL-2.0-only
vim	An extended version of the vi editor, with many additional features designed to be helpful in editing program source code.	Vim
Kakoune	An editor inspired by vi that makes use of multi cursor workflows and modal editing.	Unlicense
Neovim	A fork of vim with added Lua scripting and native LSP integration.	Apache License 2.0
BusyBox	In addition to many other utilities, includes a vi clone except for reduced functionality to minimize size.	GPL-2.0-only
nvi	A new implementation and currently the standard vi in BSD distributions.	BSD-3-Clause

== Command line interface ==
The following entries are utilities that provide no interactive user interface, only a command-line interface. They are arguably not text editors.

Name	Description	License
sed	A stream editor based on the scripting features in ed. A utility that parses and transforms text, using a simple, compact programming language.	Free software

== Library ==
The following entires are packages that support editing text, not text editors per se.

Name	Description	License
Cocoa text system	Supports text components of macOS.	Proprietary
Scintilla	Used as the core of several text editors.	HPND
Text Processing Utility	Language and runtime package, developed by DEC, used to implement the Language-Sensitive Editor and Extensible Versatile Editor, Eve.	Proprietary

== ASCII and ANSI art ==
These editors are specifically designed for the creation of ASCII and ANSI text art.

- ACiDDraw – designed for editing ASCII text art. Supports ANSI color (ANSI X3.64)
- TheDraw – ANSI/ASCII text editor for DOS and PCBoard file format support

=== ASCII font editors ===
- FIGlet – for creating ASCII art text
- TheDraw – DOS ANSI/ASCII text editor with built-in editor and manager of ASCII fonts

== Historical ==
=== Visual and full-screen editors ===
- Brief – a programmer's editor for DOS and OS/2
- Edit application – a programmer's editor for Classic Mac OS
- EDIT – a menu-based editor introduced to supersede Edlin in MS-DOS version 5.0 and up and available in most Microsoft Windows
- EDT – a character-based editor used on DEC PDP-11s and VMS
- O26 – written for the operator console of the CDC 6000 series machines in the mid-1960s
- Red – a VMS editor, written in Forth variant STOIC
- se – an early screen-based editor for Unix
- SED – cross-platform editor from the 1980s, ran on TOPS-10, TOPS-20 and VMS
- SPMOL-II – editor used mostly for programming on IBM mainframes with the IBM 3270 terminal
- STET (the 'STructured Editing Tool') – may have been the first folding editor; its first version was written in 1977
- TeachText
- TECO – a character-based editor, which included a programming language.

=== Line editors ===
- Colossal Typewriter – an early editor thought to be written for the PDP-1
- ed:
  - Unix's early line editor
  - CP/M's line editor
- Edlin – a line editor delivered with MS-DOS
- EDT (Univac) – a line editor for Unisys VS/9 and Fujitsu BS2000 systems
- ex – an EXtended version of Unix's ed, later evolved into the visual editor vi
- sed – a non-interactive programmable stream editor available in Unix
- TECO – one of the most advanced character-based editors, which included a programming language
- QED

== See also ==
- Outliner – Type of software to organize texts
- Source-code editor – Text editor specializing in software code
- Comparison of text editors
- List of HTML editors
- List of integrated development environments
- List of word processor programs
