= Kakoune =

Text editor

- Original author: Maxime Coste
- Initial release: 2 September 2011; 14 years ago
- Stable release: 2024.05.18 / 18 May 2024; 18 months ago
- Repository: github.com/mawww/kakoune
- Written in: C++, KakouneScript
- Operating system: Unix-like, macOS
- Type: Text editor
- License: Unlicense
- Website: kakoune.org

Kakoune (French: [kakun]) is a modal screen-based text editor program created in 2011 by French programmer Maxime Coste. The editor is heavily inspired by the classic vi by Bill Joy, as well as its successor Vim by Bram Moolenaar.

The primary focus of the Kakoune editor is efficiency, which it achieves by making heavy use of multi-cursor workflows. By default a user always has one selection, which can be widened or shortened through the use of commands and regular expressions. This allows Kakoune to behave like a structured editor despite having no knowledge of the semantics of the underlying programming language. The editor also features a modal workflow with an insert and a normal mode reminiscent of other editors based on vi. The insert mode allows for the insertion of text into the document, whereas in normal mode text input is interpreted as commands. A digital assistant represented as an ASCII art of a paper clip is also integrated into the editor which helps guide users through the keybindings, features and workflows provided by the editor.

== See also ==
- GNU Emacs
- GNU nano
- List of text editors
