= Vile (text editor) =

Text editor that combines aspects of vi and Emacs

vile
- Original author: Paul Fox
- Developer: Thomas Dickey
- Stable release: 9.8zb / 1 February 2026; 8 months ago
- Operating system: Cross-platform
- Type: Text editor
- License: GPL-2.0-only
- Website: invisible-island.net/vile/
- Repository: invisible-mirror.net/archives/vile/

vile is a text editor that combines aspects of the Emacs and vi editors. These editors are traditionally located on opposing sides of the editor wars, as users of either tend to have strong sentiments against the editor they do not use. vile attempts to reconcile these positions.

vile is an acronym which stands for "VI Like Emacs". vile 9.6 is featured in Chapter 18 of the O'Reilly book "Learning the vi and Vim Editors". An older version (vile 8.0) was presented in Chapter 12 of the O'Reilly book "Learning the vi Editor".

The program is also known as xvile for the X Window System, and as winvile for Microsoft Windows.

vile was created and originally maintained by Paul Fox. In 1996, maintenance was taken over by Thomas Dickey, who had provided many major contributions to the codebase over the preceding years.

== Learning to use vile ==
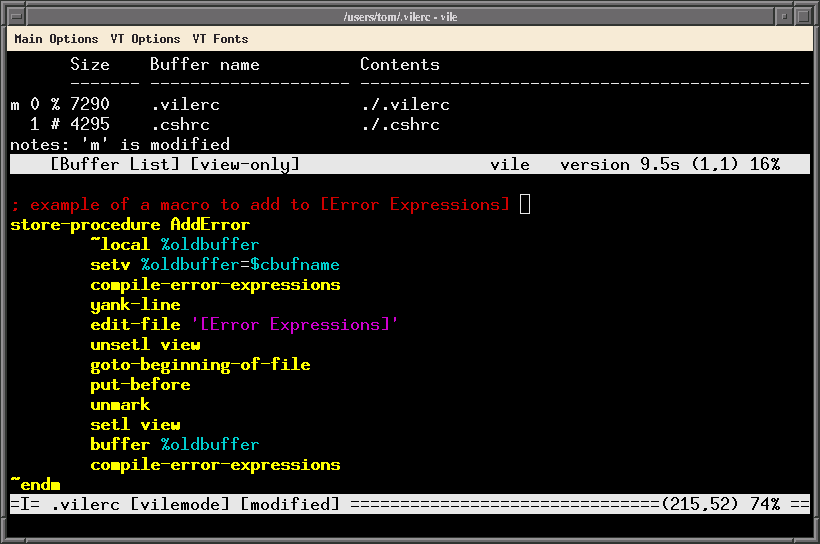
Example of [Buffer List], a dynamic window updated as a buffer is modified.

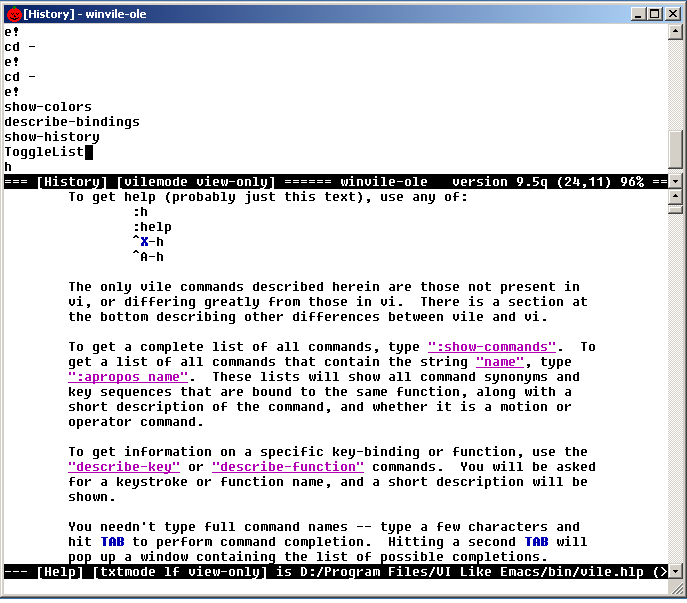
winvile and online help focusing on differences from vi.

Historically, vile's documentation has focused on differences from vi. This is in contrast to the other common vi-clones (elvis, nvi and vim), which have combined their respective extensions with the original vi documentation.

vile's documentation is three parts:

- The online help file (type :h)
- Specialized topics such as the macro language (text files)
- Built-in documentation.
  - Tables of commands and other data
  - Dynamic windows showing register contents, mode-settings, etc.

vile is built from a combination of hand-crafted code and tables processed by a special-purpose program. The predefined information from the tables can be rendered in various ways, including showing the available commands, providing name-completion, etc. In other flavors of vi, the analogous tables are not distinct from the hand-crafted code.

In other vi flavors, the information shown is static, requiring interaction from the user to make it update. In vile, however, this information is dynamic—it updates these special windows as changes are made to the features they render, e.g., the list of all buffers in memory, the mode-settings corresponding to the buffer which has focus, etc.

While many of vile's features are now found in other vi-compatible editors, some of the most powerful were implemented before widespread adoption in the others. For example, multiple windows were early features in vile (and xvi) from the start. The same applies to reading from pipes, complex fences. Some of this is brought out in the O'Reilly book, though no careful study has been made of the way in which features are adopted and adapted across the vi and emacs variants.

== Features ==
=== Command completion ===
vile supports command completion for several elements of a command: the command name, filename, directory name, and mode values.

=== Major modes ===
Both vi and emacs have modes, which are settings which affect the behavior of the program. vile extends the vi modes such as list, number, etc., by providing three levels of mode: global, buffer and window. The buffer modes are associated with the buffer contents, e.g., line-terminators, read-only attributes. All of those modes are predefined. vile can be customized by defining majormodes, which combine specific settings of the buffer modes with an association to the file type. These majormodes have as well special modes such as the association with a specific syntax filter.

=== Syntax highlighting ===
vile performs syntax highlighting by running a syntax filter program which parses the buffer contents. Initially this was a separate program. However, to improve performance and avoid display problems, these syntax filters usually are compiled into the editor. Most of the syntax filters are implemented with lex (preferably flex), with the remainder in C to address irregular grammars such as Perl and Ruby. All of the syntax filters follow the same design:

- Read from an external file the color- and video-attribute information into a chained hash table,
- Parse the file according to the lexical rules,
- Find the corresponding color- and video-attribute information for each lexical element, and
- Write a marked-up copy of the file which is read by vile (via a pipe if the syntax filters are external programs, or via a function call if they are internal).

vile paints the markup information on top of the buffer contents using in regions delimited by line and column numbers. The markup is not attached to the underlying buffer contents. To update the markup as the buffer is changed requires reanalysis. This is done automatically when the user pauses.

== History ==
vile has been under continuous development since 1990.

== See also ==
- List of text editors
- Comparison of text editors
