= Elvis (text editor) =

Enhanced clone of the vi text editor

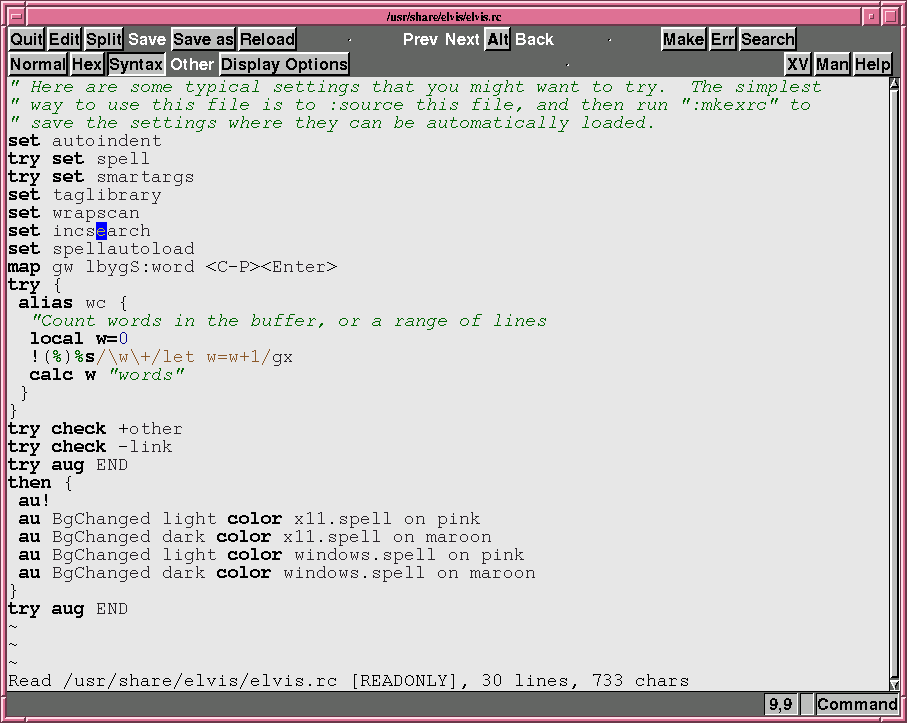
- Elvis
- Original author: Steve Kirkendall
- Stable release: 2.2 / October 21, 2003; 22 years ago
- Written in: C
- Platform: Cross-platform, including Unix, Linux and Microsoft Windows
- Available in: English
- Type: Text editor
- License: ClArtistic (Note: Clarified Artistic License)
- Website: elvis.the-little-red-haired-girl.org

Elvis is an enhanced clone of the vi text editor, first released in January 1990. It introduced several new features, including syntax highlighting and built-in support for viewing nroff and HTML documents. Elvis is written by Steve Kirkendall and is distributed under the Clarified Artistic License (ClArtistic) which is used by Perl and is a GPL-compatible free software license.

Elvis is the version of vi that comes with Slackware, Frugalware, and KateOS.

== Comments ==
Elvis was the pioneering vi clone, widely admired in the 1990s for its conciseness, and many features. It influenced the development of Vim until about 1997.

It was the first to provide color syntax highlighting (and to generalize syntax highlighting to multiple file types), first to provide highlighted selections via keyboard.

Elvis's built-in nroff (early) and (later) HTML displays gave it unusual WYSIWYG features.

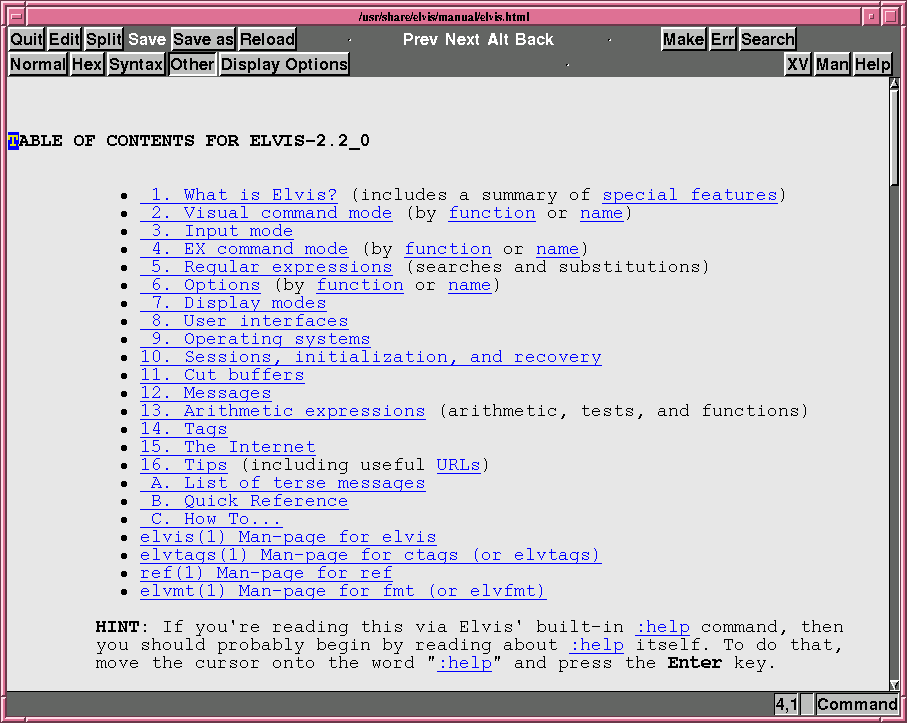
Example of Elvis' hypertext help screen.

Elvis recognizes binary files, as well and provides a split screen for editing them.

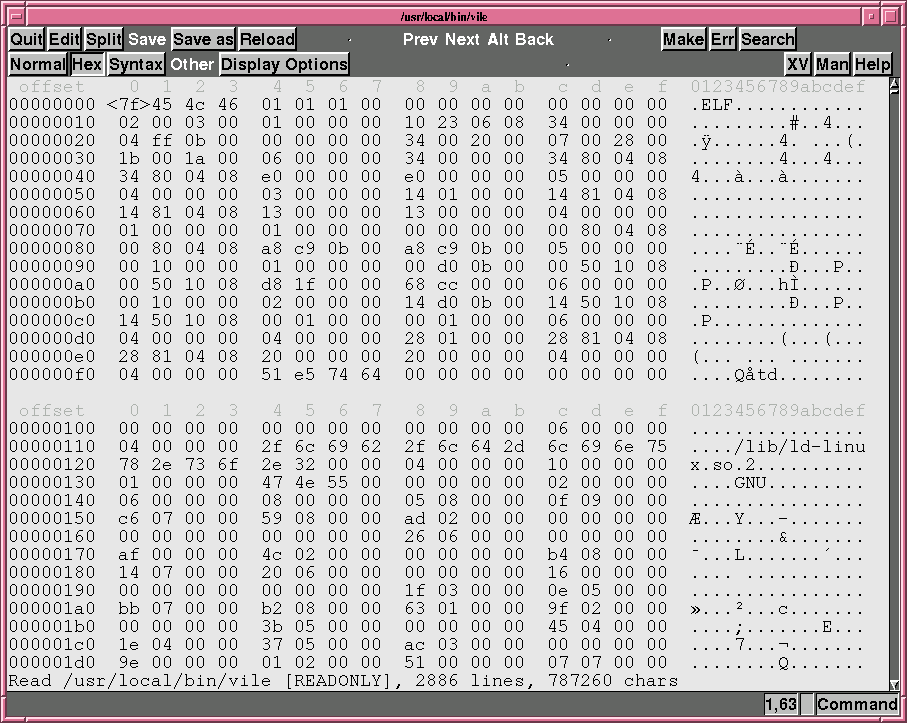
Example of Elvis' hexadecimal editing mode.

jelvis, a Japanese variant, is available, based on work by Jun-ichiro itojun Hagino up until 1998. His more recent work in this area has been distributed as patches against nvi. A Korean variant helvis is also available, originally by Park Chong-Dae. These variants were modifications of elvis 1.8 (July 10, 1994). The nvi editor is based on an older version of elvis 1.5 (April 2, 1992).

== History ==
Steve Kirkendall posted the first version of Elvis to the Usenet newsgroup comp.os.minix in early January, 1990, intending it to be a more complete and faithful clone of Vi than Tim Thompson's Stevie (ST editor for VI enthusiasts), released three years previously. Kirkendall outlined several ways in which Elvis was different from Stevie, namely:

- The text is stored in a temporary file, just like the real vi, and unlike stevie. Because of this, you can edit files that are larger than a single process' data space. Also, you can recover your file after a crash or power failure.
- Arrow keys work in input mode. In fact, if you invoke the editor via the name "input", then it will start editing in input mode. You can make your changes, and then exit by hitting Control-Z twice, and NEVER go into visual command mode. In other words, elvis can act pretty much like a normal editor -- something that the real vi certainly can't do.
- Long lines are displayed differently. Where vi and stevie wrap the line onto several rows of the screen, elvis displays it on one row and allows you to scroll sideways.

In addition, in Elvis almost all ex/vi commands worked (except :@, :abbr, and :preserve in ex mode and @ in visual mode and appending to named buffers).

It quickly attracted considerable interest in a number of enthusiast communities. Andrew Tanenbaum quickly asked the community to decide one of these two editors to be the vi clone in Minix; Elvis was chosen, and remains the vi clone for Minix today.

In 1989, Lynne Jolitz and William Jolitz began porting BSD Unix to run on 386 class processors, but to create a free distribution they needed to avoid any AT&T-contaminated code, including Bill Joy's vi. To fill the void left by removing vi, their 1992 386BSD distribution adopted Elvis as its vi replacement. But at UC Berkeley, Keith Bostic wanted a “bug for bug compatible” replacement for Joy's vi for 4.4BSD-Lite. Using Kirkendall's Elvis (version 1.8) as a starting point, Bostic created nvi, releasing it in Spring of 1994.

In August 1994, Kirkendall announced that he was working on a major rewrite of Elvis, and in October 1996, it was ready for release. The new version had a number of new features, including

- Multiple edit buffers, so you can edit several files at the same time.
- Multiple windows, so those edit buffers can share screen space.
- Multiple display modes, including...
  - "normal" which looks like the traditional vi screen
  - "hex" which is good for viewing binary files
  - "syntax" which supports syntax coloring (configurable)
  - "man" which formats Unix man-pages like nroff
  - "html" which formats Web pages
- Online hypertextual help
- A variety of user interfaces, including...
  - "termcap" which uses text screens like the traditional vi
  - "x11" which provides a GUI interface for Unix/X Window users
  - Compiling: elvis can parse error messages, and move to source of error
- WYSIWYG printing, with drivers for most printer types
- Built-in calculator with a C-like syntax
- Extreme customizability
- "Open" mode, for one-line-at-a-time editing even on very dumb terminals

In December 1998, Kirkendall released Elvis 2.1, with added features, including name completion, via the <Tab> key, network protocols (allowing can reading/writing via Web URLs), and a "tex" display mode. Kirkendall maintained the 2.1 release with bugfixes and minor enhancements as 2.1_1, 2.1_2, 2.1_3, and culminating in 2.1_4, released in October 1999.

In October 2003, four years after the previous release, Kirkendall released Elvis 2.2, which added a number of new features, including a built-in context-sensitive spell checker, text folding, region highlighting, and user-definable URL protocols. In addition, it adopted a number of ideas from Vim.
