= Joe's Own Editor =

Text editor

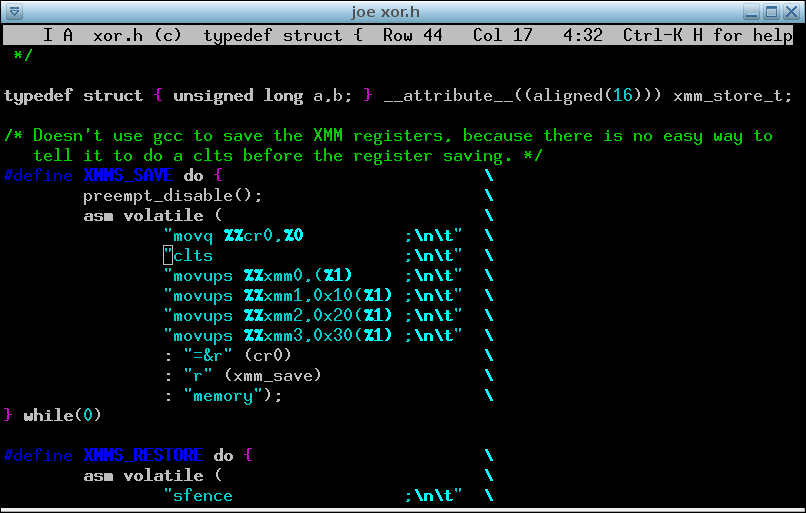
- Joe 3.5, editing a C header file
- Original author: Joseph H. Allen
- Developers: Joseph H. Allen, Marek 'Marx' Grac and others
- Release: joe0.0.0 ca. August 22, 1991; 35 years ago
- Stable release: 4.8 / 23 April 2026; 5 months ago
- Written in: C
- Operating system: Unix-like, DOS, Win32
- Platform: Cross-platform
- Size: ≈0.45 MiB (macOS/x86)
- Available in: English, German, French, Russian, Ukrainian
- Type: Text editor
- License: GPL v2
- Website: joe-editor.sourceforge.net
- Repository: github.com/joe-editor/joe

JOE or Joe's Own Editor is an ncurses-based text editor for Unix systems, available under the GPL. It is designed to be easy to use.

JOE is available for most major Linux distributions, open-source BSD systems and Apple's macOS via package managers such as Homebrew.

== Description of features ==
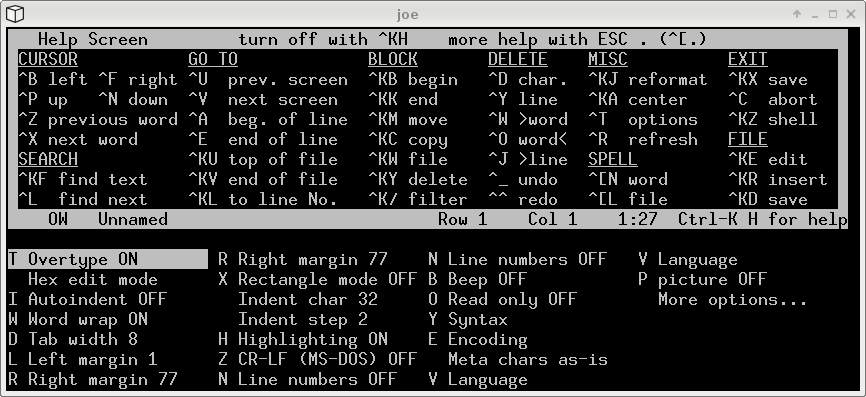
The upper part of the screen displays the integrated help, while the lower part of the screen shows the options menu. (The actual editing space in the middle is reduced to a single line for the sole purpose of making this compact illustration.)

JOE includes an integrated help system and a reminder of how to get help is always on the screen. The key sequences in JOE are similar to those of WordStar and Turbo C: many are combinations of the ⌃ Control key and another key, or combinations of Ctrl+K and another key, or combinations of the ⎋ Escape key and another key. Numerous settings are also available through Ctrl+T. The program is generally customizable through an extensive configuration file, and it supports color syntax highlighting for numerous popular file formats, a feature that is also configurable.

JOE installs hard links and a set of rc files that configure JOE to emulate Emacs keybindings (when invoked as jmacs), Pico (when invoked as jpico), or WordStar (when invoked as jstar). There is also a variant called "rjoe", which is restricted in that it allows one to edit only the files specified on the command line (which can be useful to enforce the principle of least privilege).

While the user interface of the editor is reminiscent of DOS editors, it also includes the typical Unix editor features such as internal command history, tab completion in file selection menus, regular expression search system and the ability to filter (pipe) arbitrary blocks of text through any external command.

== History ==
JOE was among the default editors in the early popular Linux distributions, which gave it some prominence and helped build a user base. It continues to be included as an option in Linux distributions, sometimes in the critical role as a "rescue mode" editor.

After version 2.8 was released by Joseph Allen in 1995, the development cycle had halted for several years. The development was taken over by a new group of enthusiasts in 2001, led by Marek Grac, who released 2.9 and several later versions, introducing a standardized build system and fixing many bugs. Allen returned to the project in 2004 and released version 3.0, which introduced syntax highlighting and support for UTF-8.

== See also ==
- Feature comparison of text editors
- Limited performance comparison of text editors
- List of text editors
- Nano
- ne
- WordStar diamond
