= MicroEMACS =

Small text editor program from the EMACS family

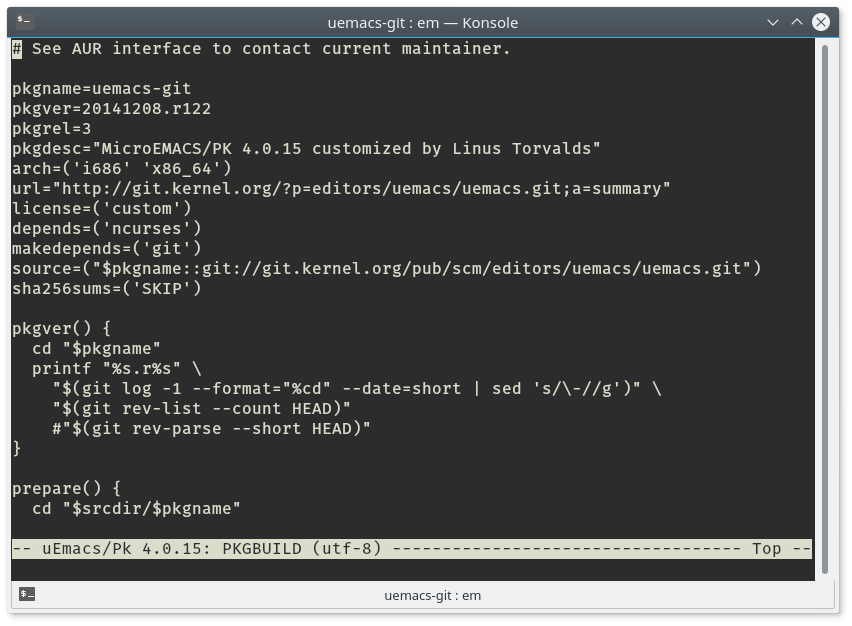
- uEmacs/Pk 4.0.15 on Linux
- Developers: Dave Conroy, Daniel M. Lawrence
- Release: 1985; 41 years ago
- Stable release: 4.0 / March 20, 1996; 30 years ago
- Preview release: 5.0
- Written in: ANSI C
- Operating system: Multiplatform
- Type: Text editor
- License: Source-available software; in-house commercial use is allowed JASSPA: GPL-2.0-or-later

MicroEMACS is a small, portable Emacs-like text editor originally written by Dave Conroy in 1985, and further developed by Daniel M. Lawrence (1958–2010) and was maintained by him. MicroEMACS has been ported to many operating systems, including CP/M, MS-DOS, Microsoft Windows, VMS, Atari ST, AmigaOS, OS-9, NeXTSTEP, and various Unix-like operating systems.

Variants of MicroEMACS also exist, such as mg, a more GNU Emacs-compatible editor. Many relationships to contemporary editors can also be found in MicroEMACS. The vi clone vile was derived from an older version of MicroEMACS.

University of Washington's simple text editor Pico was based on MicroEMACS 3.6. Pico's featureset and interface would later be emulated in the free software clone GNU nano due to its ambiguous licensing terms.

Linus Torvalds, creator of Linux, has been a user of MicroEMACS since his days as a student at the University of Helsinki. Torvalds also maintains a fork called uEmacs/Pk, based on MicroEMACS 3.9e.

== See also ==
- List of text editors
- Comparison of text editors
