= Sed (disambiguation) =

sed is a Unix utility for processing text.

Sed or SED may also refer to:

== Biology and medicine ==
- Erythrocyte sedimentation rate (sed rate), a haematology test
- Sedirea (Sed.), a genus of orchids
- Selective eating disorder or avoidant/restrictive food intake disorder
- Spondyloepiphyseal dysplasia congenita, an inherited genetic bone disorder

== Science and technology ==
- DEC SED ("screen editor"), a text editor for some DEC operating systems
- sed, "stream editor", a simple command-line text editor in unix-like system
- Self-encrypting device, an encrypting hard drive
- Spectral energy distribution, of an astronomical source
- Stochastic electrodynamics, in quantum mechanics
- Surface-conduction electron-emitter display, a flat-panel display technology

== Organisations and businesses ==
- Scottish Education Department
- SED Systems, a Canadian satellite communications provider
- Socialist Unity Party of Germany (German: Sozialistische Einheitspartei Deutschlands), East German communist party
- Swiss Seismological Service (German: Schweizerische Erdbebendienst)
- Tata Power SED, Tata Power Strategic Electronics Division

== Other uses ==
- Saturn Electrostatic Discharges (SEDs)
- Survey of English Dialects
- Strategic Economic Dialogue
- Sed card, a "portfolio-on-a-card" used by models and actors
- Sed festival, in Ancient Egypt
- Shippers Export Declaration, a US form
- St. Elizabeth's, Dundonald, religious site in Dundonald
- Wepwawet, Egyptian god also called Sed

== See also ==
- Students for the Exploration and Development of Space (SEDS)
