= Editor war =

Rivalry between Emacs and vi text editors

The editor war is the rivalry between users of the Emacs and vi (now usually Vim) text editors. The rivalry has become an enduring part of hacker culture and the free software community.

The Emacs versus vi debate was one of the original "holy wars" conducted on Usenet groups. Since at least 1985, many flame wars have occurred between those insisting that their editor of choice is the paragon of editing perfection, and insulting the opposing group accordingly. Related battles have been fought over operating systems, programming languages, version control systems, and even source code indent style.

== Background ==
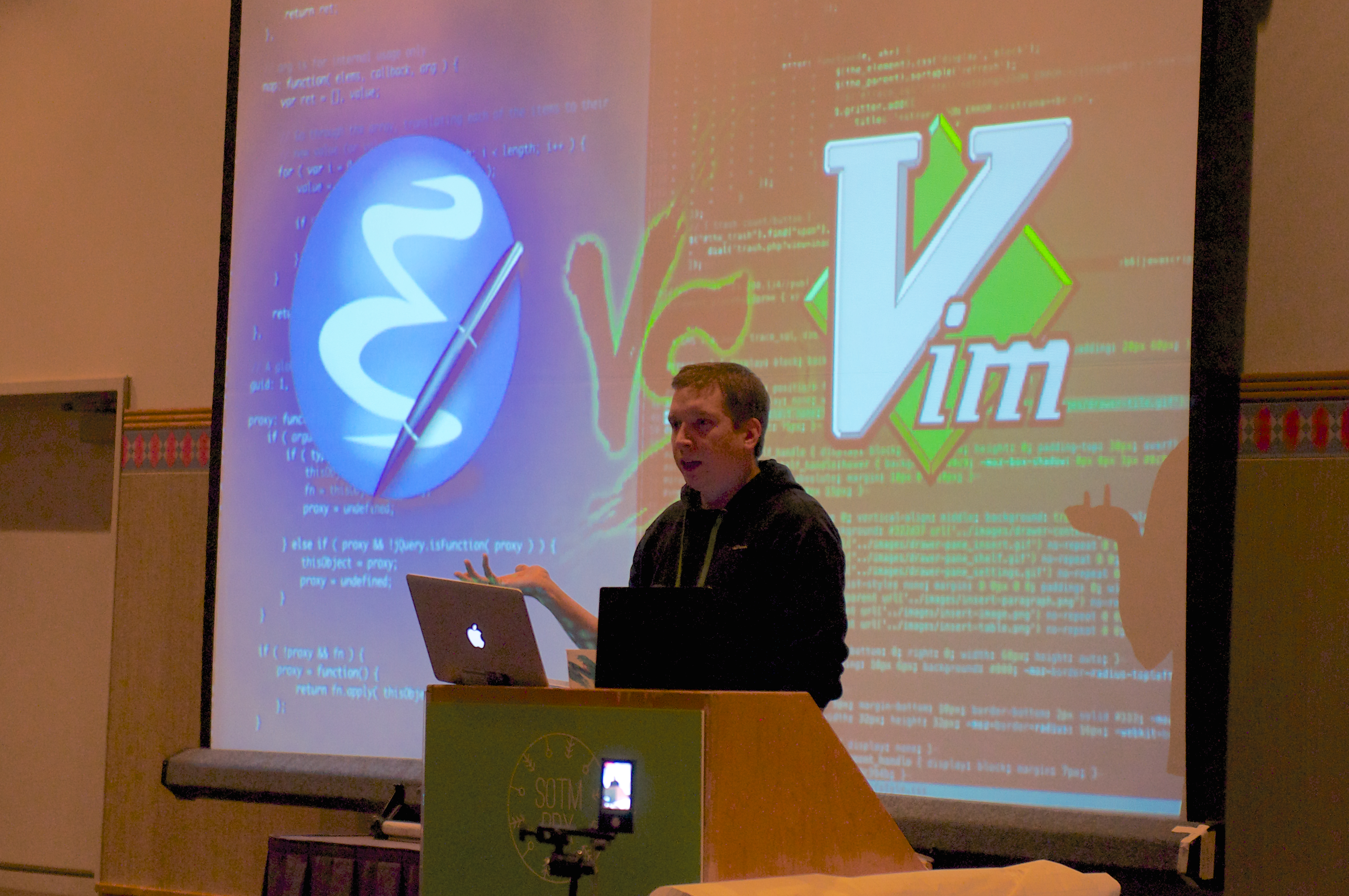
Editor choice being brought up during a presentation at a technology convention

As of 2020, both Emacs and vi can lay claim to being among the longest-lived application programs of all time, as well as being the two most commonly used text editors on Linux and Unix. Many operating systems, especially Linux and BSD derivatives, bundle multiple text editors with the operating system to cater to user demand. For example, a default installation of macOS contains ed, pico (nano before macOS Monterey 12.3), TextEdit, Vim, and Emacs (Mg replaces Emacs after macOS Catalina).

== Humor ==
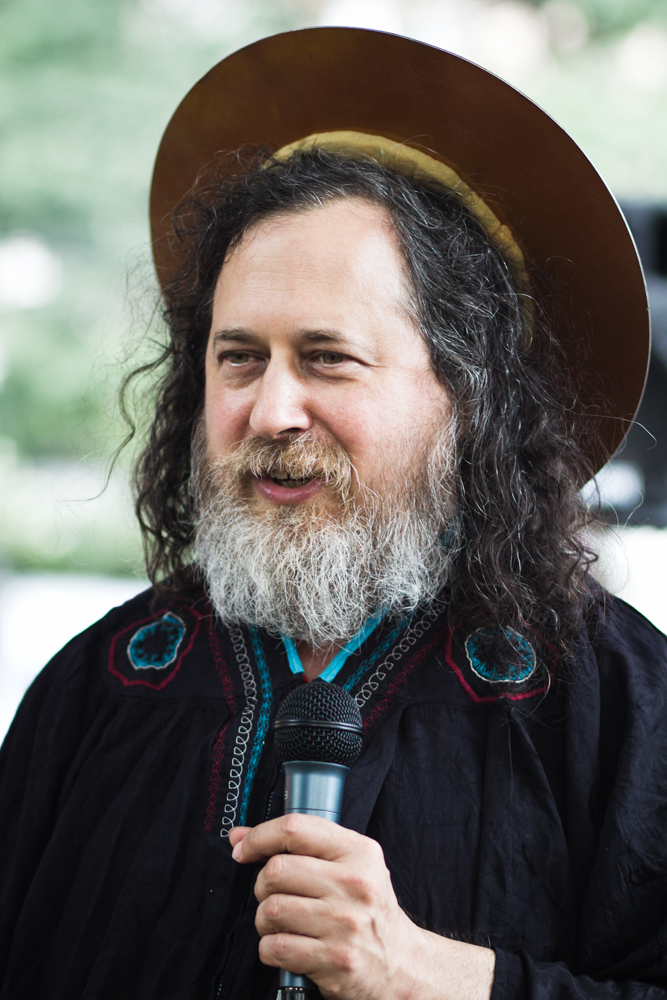
Richard Stallman appearing as St IGNU−cius, a saint in the Church of Emacs

The Church of Emacs, formed by Emacs and the GNU Project's creator Richard Stallman, is a parody religion. While it refers to vi as the "editor of the beast" (vi-vi-vi being 6-6-6 in Roman numerals), it does not oppose the use of vi; rather, it calls proprietary software a case of anathema. ("Using a free version of vi is not a sin but a penance.") The Church of Emacs has its own newsgroup, alt.religion.emacs, that has posts purporting to support this belief system.

Regarding vi's modal nature (a common point of frustration for new users), some Emacs users joke that vi has two modes – "beep repeatedly" and "break everything." vi users enjoy joking that Emacs's key-sequences induce carpal tunnel syndrome, or mentioning one of many satirical expansions of the acronym EMACS. These include "Escape Meta Alt Control Shift" (a jab at Emacs's reliance on modifier keys), "Eight Megabytes And Constantly Swapping" (in a time when that was a great amount of memory), "EMACS Makes Any Computer Slow" (a recursive acronym like those Stallman uses), or "Eventually Munches All Computer Storage" in reference to Emacs's high system resource requirements. Nonetheless, key bindings from both editors are found in many other contexts. GNU EMACS has been expanded to "Generally Not Used, Except by Middle-Aged Computer Scientists" referencing its most ardent fans and its declining usage among younger programmers in comparison to more graphically oriented editors such as Atom, BBEdit, Sublime Text, Kate, TextMate, Notepad++, and Visual Studio Code.

As a poke at Emacs' creeping featurism, vi advocates have been known to describe Emacs as "a great operating system, lacking only a decent editor". Emacs advocates have been known to respond that the editor is actually very good, but the operating system could use improvement (referring to Emacs' famous lack of concurrency, which has now been added).

A game among UNIX users, either to test the depth of an Emacs user's understanding of the editor or to poke fun at the complexity of Emacs, involved predicting what would happen if a user held down a modifier key (such as Ctrl or Alt) and typed their own name. This game humor originated with users of the older TECO editor, which was the implementation basis, via macros, of the original Emacs.

Performing a Google search for "vim" will display "Did you mean: emacs", and performing a search for "emacs" will display "Did you mean: vim".

In the web series A Murder at the End of the World, there is a scene referencing the editor wars where a character asks a woman if she uses Vi or Emacs.

== See also ==
- Console war
- Browser wars
- Comparison of text editors
