= Learning the vi and Vim Editors =

Tutorial book by Arnold Robbins, Elbert Hannah, and Linda Lamb

- Author: Arnold Robbins, Elbert Hannah, Linda Lamb
- Original title: Learning the vi Editor
- Language: English
- Subject: vi and vim editors
- Genre: Tutorial book
- Publisher: O'Reilly Media
- Publication date: 1986 to 2021
- English publication date: 1986 to 2021
- Pages: 500
- ISBN: 978-1-492-07880-7 (eight edition)

Learning the vi and Vim Editors is a tutorial book for the vi and vim text editors written by Arnold Robbins, Elbert Hannah, and Linda Lamb and published by O'Reilly Media. The book is in its 8th edition. The book features a tarsier on the cover, an image which was also used on the cover of O'Reilly's Unix in a Nutshell and has been incorporated into O'Reilly Media. When questioned about the animal choice, publisher Tim O'Reilly described the tarsier as looking "like somebody who had been a [sic] text editor for too long."

Author Arnold Robbins also coauthored the O'Reilly titles Unix In A Nutshell, Effective awk Programming, sed & awk, Classic Shell Scripting, and several titles in the pocket reference series related to those languages and tools. Elbert is a software engineer retired from the telecom industry. Linda Lamb is a former O'Reilly employee.

In his 2008 review of the 7th edition for Dr. Dobb's Journal, author Mike Riley compared the coverage afforded by the book to a combination of the Vim online documentation and O'Reilly's vi Editor Pocket Reference. While noting that the book "continues to fulfill an apparent market need," he did not find the book appropriate for more advanced users.

== Editions ==
- First edition (February 1986)
- Second edition (April 1986)
- Third edition (August 1987)
- Fourth edition (June 1988)
- Fifth edition (October 1990)
- Sixth edition (November 1998)
- Seventh edition (July 2008; 496 pages; ISBN 978-0-596-52983-3)
- Eighth edition (November 2021; 500 pages; ISBN 978-1-492-07880-7)
