= Yudit =

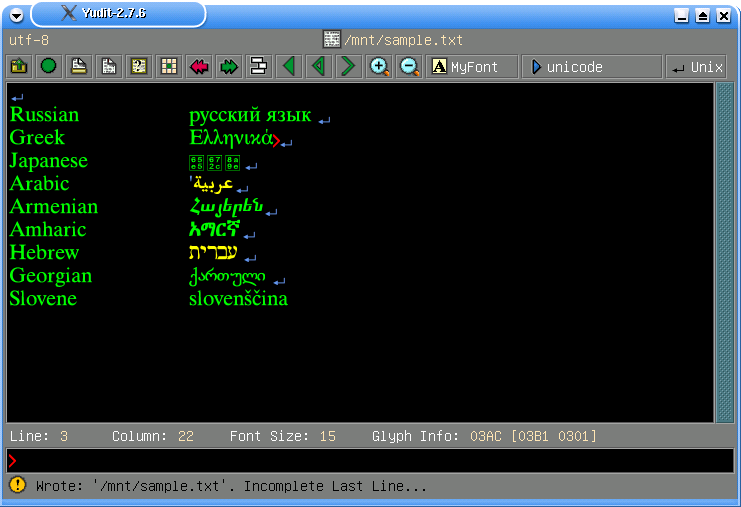
- Demonstration of Yudit
- Developer: Gáspár Sinai
- Initial release: 8 November 1997; 28 years ago
- Stable release: 3.1.0 / 11 February 2023; 3 years ago
- Written in: C++
- Operating system: Unix-like
- Type: Text editor for the X Window System
- License: GPL-2.0-only
- Website: yudit.org

Yudit is a Unicode text editor for the X Window System. It also supports Linux and macOS. It supports TrueType font rendering, printing, transliterated keyboard input and handwriting recognition with no dependencies on external engines or user interface libraries like Qt or GTK+.

Yudit's conversion utilities can convert text between various encodings. Keyboard input maps can also act like text converters. There is no need for a pre-installed multi-lingual environment. Menus are translated into multiple languages.

The developer states that "since the early days of Unicode on Linux", support has improved making future versions of the program unlikely, though documentation may be updated.

It supports simultaneous processing of many languages, input methods, conversions for local character standards etc. It has facilities for entering text in all languages with only an English keyboard, using keyboard configuration maps.

The author of Yudit is Gáspár Sinai, a Hungarian programmer, living and working in Japan.

== See also ==
- List of text editors
- Comparison of text editors
