= Se (text editor) =

se
- Stable release: 3.0 / March 6, 2013
- Written in: C
- Operating system: Linux, FreeBSD, NetBSD, OpenBSD, OpenSolaris, GNU, Haiku, MINIX, Cygwin
- Type: text editor
- License: Public domain software
- Website: se-editor.org

se (screen-editor) is also known as the Georgia Tech Screen Editor. According to the README file in its sources, Se started out as the version of 'ed' that came with the book 'Software Tools', by Kernighan and Plauger, which was written in Ratfor.

Several people, including Dan Forsyth and Arnold Robbins, worked on the program, making improvements before and after converting it to C in early 1985. The program was first posted to the comp.sources.unix newsgroup in December 1986. The final version noted in the external links dates from 1987.

There was also a different (and earlier) se screen-based editor for Unix, which was based on ed.
