= Nvi =

Re-implementation of ex/vi

nvi
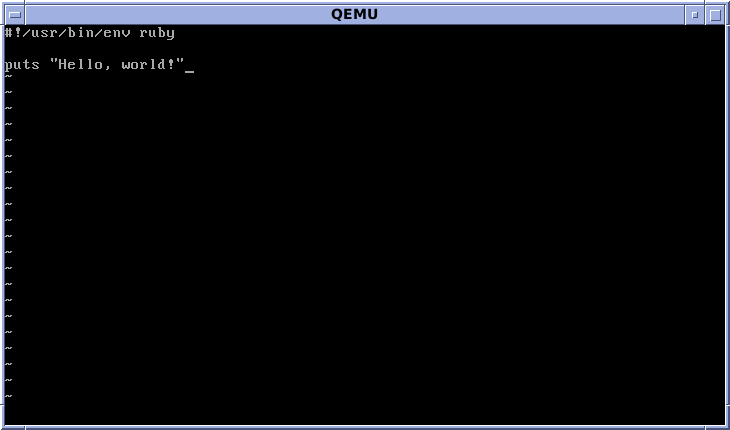
- The vi editor in OpenBSD (nvi), editing a small "Hello, world!" type Ruby program
- Stable release: 1.81.6 / 18 November 2007
- License: BSD-3-Clause
- Website: sites.google.com/a/bostic.com/keithbostic/the-berkeley-vi-editor-home-page
- Repository: repo.or.cz/nvi.git

nvi (new vi) is a re-implementation of the classic Berkeley text editor, ex/vi, traditionally distributed with BSD and, later, Unix systems. It was originally distributed as part of the Fourth Berkeley Software Distribution (4BSD).

Due to licensing disputes between AT&T and the Computer Systems Research Group (CSRG) at the University of California, Berkeley, the CSRG was required to replace all Unix-derived portions of BSD source with new and unencumbered code. nvi was one of many components rewritten, despite the fact that the original vi was from UC Berkeley. AT&T had a legal claim over the license.

== Credits and distribution ==
nvi was written by Keith Bostic. It is the default vi on all major BSD systems (NetBSD, OpenBSD, and FreeBSD) as well as MINIX.

It was originally derived from the first incarnation of elvis, written by Steve Kirkendall, as noted in the README file included in nvi's sources.

Sven Verdoolaege added support for Unicode in 2000.

BSD projects continue to use nvi version 1.79 due to licensing differences between Berkeley Database 1.85 and the later versions by Sleepycat Software. nvi is unusual because it uses a database to store the text as it is being edited. Sven Verdoolaege's changes after version 1.79 use locking features not available in the Berkeley DB 1.85 database. Reportedly, changes to nvi after 1.79 make it less vi-compatible.

nvi can vary subtly across the BSDs.

nvi is only available on POSIX/Unix platforms due to its reliance on the curses/ncurses library.

An unmaintained, multilingual version by the late Jun-ichiro itojun Hagino is available as nvi-m17n.

A currently-maintained, multibyte version is available as nvi2, and is the default vi on DragonFly BSD.

== See also ==
- vile
- vim
- vi (text editor) § Ports and clones
