= Multi-Edit =

Text editing software

- Original author: Todd Johnson
- Developers: American Cybernetics, Inc.
- Initial release: 1980s
- Stable release: 11.04 / 2008; 18 years ago
- Operating system: Microsoft Windows
- Type: Text editor
- License: Commercial proprietary software
- Website: multieditsoftware.com

Multi-Edit was a commercial text editor for Microsoft Windows created in the 1980s by Todd Johnson. Multi Edit Software obtained ownership rights for the product in October 2002. Multi-Edit contains tools for programmers, including macros, configurable syntax highlighting, code folding, file type conversions, project management, regular expressions, three block highlight modes including column, stream and line modes, remote editing of files via FTP and interfaces for APIs or command lines of choice. The editor uses a tabbed document interface and sessions can be saved.

Multi-Edit was originally written in Pascal and was built to run in MS-DOS and has since been ported to Windows. The most recent release is dated from 2008. No compatibility information for Windows versions after Windows 7 is available from the product's website.

HTML editing features include:

- Integration with CSE HTML Validator for offline HTML, XHTML and CSS checking
- HTML toolbar preconfigured for popular functions and HTML tags
- Customization of languages, templates, menus, toolbars and the UI with its CMac macro language

Multi-Edit is a shareware product. It can be evaluated for free for 30 days, after which the user must purchase a license to continue using the software.

Note: As of August 2022, the Multi-Edit website, including all of the forums, is off-line and not accessible.

== Features ==
Multi-Edit also has the following features:

- Open and edit large files
- Column/Stream/Line (block) mode editing
- Regular expression find and replace
- Find/Replace in Files
- Extensible code highlighting, with 'wordfiles' already available for many languages
- Code collapsing and hierarchical function listing
- Beautify and reformat source code
- Smart templates for code completion
- Hex viewing
- File/data sorting
- Project management
- Sessions
- Bookmarking
- Automation via macros and scripts
- Integrated file comparison
- Includes BCDiffer a built-in File Compare Utility created by Scooter Software

== History ==
Multi-Edit was developed by Todd M. Johnson as a source code editor, at a time when the only other popular source code editor for MS-DOS was Brief. As a DOS editor it offered features such as user-configurable syntax highlighting for language-specific color coding of keywords and symbols. Even after the appearance of integrated development environments in the mid-1990s, it remained popular for features such as its macro language, easy customization, and multiple language support. As of 2011, it was one of the few surviving editors from the 1990s era when text editors were regarded as indispensable programming tools.

== The Ending ==
On 06/18/21, the following message was posted on the MultiEdit support forum, in response to a user request:

"This is from the MESI CEO.

As you are well aware, we have not had a new product release in some many years now. This is not due to a lack of desire, but an unfortunate limitation of our product build.

When our partner Dan Hughes passed away of a sudden heart attack, he took with him all our product build secrets leaving us with no way to recreate the Multi-Edit 2008 build. As a result, we are unable to provide any patch releases or new features. Our Multi-Edit x build unfortunately has run out of funding to complete that project as a result of lack of sales for Multi-Edit 2008.

You can now see there are little options available to us for going forward with the Multi-Edit product builds. For this reason we are merely continuing to keep Multi-Edit on the market and alive with support for our existing user base and anyone who still seeks purchase of the product.

Thank you for being a dedicated Multi-Edit user and continuing to use and support our product! "

That was the last update that was received from the developers; then in August 2022, the Multi-Edit website, including all of the forums, went off-line and has remained off-line ever since.

== See also ==
- List of text editors
- Comparison of text editors
