= Ne (text editor) =

Text editor for POSIX operating systems

ne
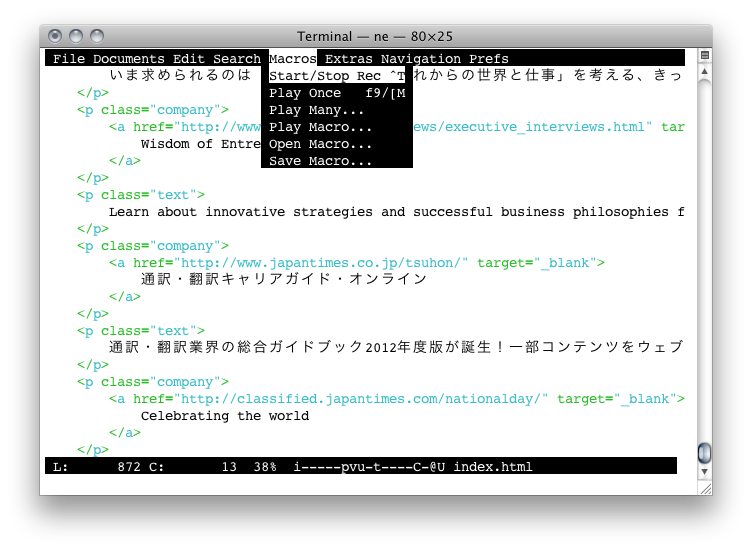
- Developers: Sebastiano Vigna, Todd Lewis
- Release: 1993; 33 years ago
- Stable release: 3.3.4 / 6 February 2025; 17 months ago
- Written in: C
- Operating system: POSIX/Unix/Linux
- Type: Text editor
- License: GPL-3.0-or-later
- Website: ne.di.unimi.it
- Repository: github.com/vigna/ne

ne (for "nice editor") is a console text editor for POSIX computer operating systems such as Linux or Mac OS X. It uses the terminfo library, but it can also be compiled using a bundled copy of the GNU termcap implementation. There is also a Cygwin version. It was developed by Sebastiano Vigna of the University of Milan.

ne is intended to provide an alternative to vi that will be more familiar to beginners and modern users and still be portable across all POSIX-compliant operating systems, and remain usable on slow remote connections. It uses GUI-derived keyboard shortcuts such as Ctrl+Q to quit and Ctrl+O to open a file instead of the multi-mode command structure of vi. It supports many features common in advanced text editors, such as syntax highlighting, regular expressions, configurable menus and keybindings and autocomplete. ne can pipe a marked block of text through any command line filter using the Through command bound to Meta+T by default. ne has some support for UTF-8 encoding and is 8-bit clean.

ne was originally developed on an Amiga 3000T using the curses library and was inspired by that platform's TurboText editor, which was written by Martin Taillefer. Development then moved to Linux in order to take advantage of the terminfo library. Todd Lewis joined the development team, donating code he wrote to add features required at the University of North Carolina at Chapel Hill, which implemented ne as part of their migration of their research computers from MVS to UNIX. Daniele Filaretti helped with syntax highlighting using code derived from the Joe editor.

Version 2.6 adds narrowing for the file open screen, adds status indicators in the open documents list and improves syntax highlighting. Version 3.1.0 is fully 64-bit: file size and line length are limited only by the core memory and disk space available, as large files are memory mapped transparently.

Linux Voice has rated ne as the third best editor for Linux.

== See also ==
- List of text editors
- Comparison of text editors
- List of Unix commands
