= Tex-Edit Plus =

Freeware text editor for Mac OS

- Developer: Trans-Tex Software
- Stable release: 4.10.4 / September 24, 2016
- Operating system: Mac OS X
- Available in: multilingual
- Type: text editor
- License: Freeware
- Website: www.tex-edit.com

Tex-Edit Plus is a freeware text editor for the Mac OS written by Tom Bender. The program is named after Texas, the author's home state, and has nothing to do with TeX or LaTeX.

== Features ==
Tex-Edit Plus supports AppleScript and Automator, two technologies developed by Apple to speed up workflow and reduce repetitious tasks. The Find and Replace function supports grep searches. The program includes text styles, text cleaning, and can read and save ASCII, Unicode, RTF, older formats such as AppleWorks and older versions of Microsoft Word. It can read text out loud, play audio files, and run QuickTime movies. Tex-Edit Plus supports PowerPC and Intel Macs. It requires Mac OS 10.4 through 10.12. It is no longer being updated for the Mac.
