= Frugalware Linux =

- OS family: Linux (Unix-like)
- Working state: Discontinued
- Source model: Open source
- Latest release: 2.1 (Derowd) / 5 September 2016; 10 years ago
- Package manager: pacman-g2
- Supported platforms: i686, x86 64
- Kernel type: Monolithic kernel
- Default user interface: KDE Plasma Desktop - GNOME - Xfce - LXDE
- License: Various
- Official website: frugalware.org

Frugalware Linux was a general-purpose Linux distribution designed for intermediate users who were familiar with command-line operations. Early versions were based on Slackware, but it later became an independently developed distribution. Frugalware makes use of the Pacman package management system from Arch Linux.

== History ==
Frugalware was founded in 2004 by Miklós Vajna. He considered Slackware's package manager pkgtools too slow, and wanted to rewrite it in C. He was told that it would never be accepted by Slackware, so Vajna started to think about founding a separate Linux distribution. He replaced Slackware's original init scripts and build system, and added Pacman, the package manager from Arch Linux. As a result, Frugalware was born.

The project announced it would be shutting down and discontinuing its distribution end of year 2025.

== Package management ==
Since version 0.6, Frugalware used the Pacman-G2 package manager. It was a fork of a CVS version of the complete rewrite of Pacman by Aurelien Foret, which was not officially released at the time. Previously Frugalware used a modified version of the older, monolithic Pacman by Judd Vinet.

Frugalware's packages' extension was .fpm. The packages are archives that are compressed using xz.

Repoman was a tool to compile source packages and automatically create and install closed-source packages. With Repoman, the user could also download all packages' buildscripts and recompile them with specific build options. The build options could be changed by editing a configuration file. The first Frugalware release that had Repoman was Frugalware 0.3pre1.

== Branches ==
Frugalware has a -current and a -stable branch. The -current branch is updated daily, and the -stable branch gets updated every 6 months.

== Architectures ==
From the official web site, 2012: "Frugalware currently supports x86 (Pentium Pro or higher) and x86_64 (k8, aka. amd64) platforms".

== Releases ==
Version	Codename	Release date	Notes
0.1	Genesis	2 November 2004	
0.2	Aurora	28 April 2005	
0.3	Trantor	13 October 2005	19 October 2005 (for x86-64 architecture)
0.4	Wanda	30 March 2006	
0.5	Siwenna	14 September 2006	
0.6	Terminus	22 March 2007	
0.7	Sayshell	13 October 2007	
0.8	Kalgan	11 March 2008	
0.9	Solaria	9 September 2008	
1.0	Anacreon	22 March 2009	
1.1	Getorin	7 September 2009	
1.2	Locris	8 March 2010	
1.3	Haven	23 August 2010	
1.4	Nexon	13 February 2011	
1.5	Mores	15 August 2011	
1.6	Fermus	12 February 2012	
1.7	Gaia	19 August 2012	
1.8	Cinna	6 February 2013	
1.9	Arcturus	5 November 2013	
2.0	Rigel	16 February 2015	
2.1	Derowd	5 September 2016	

All the Frugalware releases except "Genesis" were named after planets in science fiction books by Isaac Asimov.
