= SETEDIT =

SETEDIT is a computer software text editor that is an open source, multi-platform clone of the editor of Borland's Turbo IDEs, with several improvements. According to the project page, it was started in 1996. It is the editor used by RHIDE.

SETEDIT is free software released under the GPL-2.0-or-later license.
