= Programmer's File Editor =

Text editor for Microsoft Windows, 1992–1999

- Developer(s): Alan Phillips of Lancaster University
- Initial release: 28 July 1992; 33 years ago
- Final release: 1.01 / 1 February 1999; 26 years ago
- Written in: C++
- Operating system: Windows (16 and 32 bit)
- Size: 608 KB
- Available in: English
- Type: Text editor
- License: Freeware
- Website: www.lancaster.ac.uk/~steveb/cpaap/pfe

Programmer's File Editor (PFE) is a freeware text editor targeted particularly to the needs of software programmers. It was written by Alan Phillips of Lancaster University in the north of England. Development of Programmer's File Editor ceased in 1999, but the program is still in use by some programmers. It was featured in a report about free software in an episode of the BBC series The Net.

== Features ==
Strengths of the editor include:

- ability to run programs against the current file and capture their output in another window
- easy macro recorder and editor; macros can be saved and assembled into "libraries"
- line breaks, tabs, and other special characters allowed in search and replace
- file type recognition
- using batch files to perform compilation tasks from within the editor
- Customizable screen display; display and other characteristics can be set for specific file types, both pre-fab and user determined
- Multiple document interface (MDI) with tiling and minimizing supported
- Keyboard remapping allows editor to be extensively reconfigured to one's personal taste
- Printer formatting is versatile
- fast even on very large files as editor does not try to understand the text being edited

Weaknesses of the editor include:

- lack of published source code means there have been no updates for 26 years
- unique default keyboard shortcuts for search and replace (F2 for search, Shift-F2 for repeat search, F3 for search and replace) although these problems can be easily overcome by using Options->Key mapping to reprogram these shortcuts.
- Tends to lock up when opening unusually long files, or files with excessively long lines (above 16k characters)
- Lack of Unicode support (although this does mean that the characters shown are an accurate representation of the file's actual bytes).
- inability to fold code
- no support for regular expressions in find/change
- no support for redo and only limited undo
- no support for language specific Syntax highlighting
