= Stevie (text editor) =

Clone of the vi text editor, for Atari

- Original author: Tim Thompson
- Initial release: June 28, 1987; 38 years ago
- Final release: 3.7a / October 19, 1989; 36 years ago
- Written in: C
- Operating system: Atari ST, Unix-like, OS/2, Amiga
- License: Public domain
- Website: nosuch.com/tjt/stevie/

Stevie (ST editor for vi enthusiasts) is a discontinued clone of the vi text editor. Stevie was written by Tim Thompson for the Atari ST. Thompson posted his original C source code as free software to the comp.sys.atari.st Usenet newsgroup on 28 June 1987.

It was further developed (ported to Unix and OS/2, released as version 3.10 on Usenet) by Tony Andrews and G.R. (Fred) Walter. Tony Andrews added features and ported it to Unix, OS/2 and Amiga, posting his version to the comp.sources.unix newsgroup as free software on 6 June 1988.

Notably, Stevie is the basis for Vim, which has been a popular editor since its inception. In 1992, Bram Moolenaar released Vim (version 1.14 completed in 1991), which he based on the source code of the Amiga port of Stevie.

In its codebase documentation such as its README, the name is all caps, "STEVIE", but source and executable files are named using lower case, "stevie". Modern references tend to capitalize as "Stevie".
