= KateOS =

Linux distribution

- Developer: Damian Rakowski
- OS family: Linux (Unix-like)
- Working state: Defunct
- Source model: Open source
- Latest release: 3.6 / September 17, 2007
- Kernel type: Monolithic kernel
- License: Various

KateOS was a Linux distribution originally based on Slackware. It was designed for intermediate users. Its package management system used so called TGZex (.tgz) packages, which unlike Slackware packages support dependency tracking (optional), internationalized descriptions, and were designed for ease of update. There were two native tools for package management: PKG and Updateos. The last version released was KateOS III (3.6), including as a Live CD, in 2007.

== History ==
The KateOS project was founded at the end of 2003 by Damian Rakowski.

KateOS version	Release date
1.0	9 October 2004
2.0	9 April 2005
2.1	23 June 2005
2.3	13 October 2005
3.0	9 July 2006
3.1	7 October 2006
3.2	21 December 2006
3.6	17 September 2007

Kate Linux 1.0 Rabbit (series I)

The first version of the system was published on 2004-10-09. The system was based on Slackware 9.0. Due to the problems with the main server which worked only infrequently, hardly anyone learned about the existence of Kate 1.0. After a move to another server, the project has begun to gradually acquire users. After some time, Kate 1.0.1 (a fix release including UpdatePack 1), and a Live version were published.

Kate Linux 2.0 Zyklon (series II)

Version 2.0 was published on 2005-04-09, and was no longer based on Slackware. It was a long-term edition, the base for further development. It was also the first edition using Linux 2.6.

On 2005-05-06 the name of the project has been changed to KateOS.

On 2005-05-22 version 2.0.1 was published, providing a tool for managing and remotely updating the TGZex packages. The tool was called Updates, and was written by Piotr Korzuszek.

On 2005-06-23 version 2.1 was published. Updates now could install packages remotely.

On 12 August 2005, the first Live edition of series II was published. It had a more distinctive graphical design, used the squashfs technology (2 GB of data packed on just one CD) and unionfs.

On 2005-10-13 the last version of Version II was published - 2.3. Updates gained new possibilities, and the system had better hardware autodetection with the Discover tool.

KateOS 3.0 Virgen (series III)

On 12 April 2006 the first snapshot of KateOS 3.0 was published.

On 2006-07-09 version 3.0.1 was published. The packaging system was completely rewritten resulting in the PKG and Updates2 tools, and the libupdateos and libsmarttools libraries. The functionality of the TGZex packages was widened, this time to include dependency tracking and descriptions in many languages. The installation process was simplified to allow a full install in only 15 minutes. The system used udev, D-Bus and HAL to detect hardware and mount devices automatically.

On 4 August 2006 the first 'Live edition of Version III was published. It was aimed to demonstrate the possibilities of KateOS 3.0, and to be used as a data rescue system. The CD contained 2GB of data, including the Xfce desktop environment and many office and multimedia applications. It detected and configured hardware automatically.

On 7 October 2006 version 3.1 was published. It contained fixes, and the updated GNOME desktop environment. It was the first edition of Gnome adjusted especially to the KateOS system. It also included Update-notifier, a daemon for which the system trace icon changed and blinked when new updates were discovered. It let the user choose packages to be updated and update them. It was based on the libupdateos library, and only supported the KateOS packages and repositories.

On 21 December 2006 version 3.2 was published. Apart from fixes and updates, it included a new tool, KatePKG. KatePKG is a graphical package manager written in PHP with the PHP-GTK library, making KateOS the first system to include this library in the default distribution. It was designed to allow users to easily install, update, and remove packages from the system. It supports any number of repositories, including local ones (located on the user's hard drive).

On 17 September 2007 version 3.6 was released after eight months of development. This version brought several new and updated features to KateOS such as software driven suspend mode and the addition of several new programs such as KateLAN and Realm to help make configuring the system more user friendly. The Live CD version of 3.6 was the first KateOS to provide an on disc installer called Install Agent, allowing the user to directly install to their hard disk after trying the system live.

== Additional information ==
All new KateOS releases were planned to be supported for around two years. Users were encouraged to update via the updateos command to newer versions of the distribution, although major version updates (series updates), e.g. II--->III were not recommended.

Damian Rakowski, the 'project initiator, leader, and 1st developer', stated that the project was named after a friend and because the name Kate is "simple, nice and everybody knows it."
