= DEC SED =

DEC SED was a multiplatform text editor for TOPS-10, TOPS-20 and VMS written in the early 1980s by A. Christopher Hall.
