= Line editor =

Computer text editor

In computing, a line editor is a text editor in which each editing command applies to one or more complete lines of text designated by the user. Line editors predate screen-based text editors and originated in an era when a computer operator typically interacted with a teleprinter (essentially a printer with a keyboard), with no video display, and no ability to move a cursor interactively within a document.

Line editors are limited to typewriter keyboard text-oriented input and output methods. Most edits are a line-at-a-time. Typing, editing, and document display do not occur simultaneously. Typically, typing does not enter text directly into the document. Instead, users modify the document text by entering these commands on a text-only terminal. Commands and text, and corresponding output from the editor, will scroll up from the bottom of the screen in the order that they are entered or printed to the screen. Although the commands typically indicate the line(s) they modify, displaying the edited text within the context of larger portions of the document requires a separate command.

Line editors keep a reference to the "current line" to which the entered commands usually are applied. In contrast, modern screen based editors allow the user to interactively and directly navigate, select, and modify portions of the document. Generally line numbers or a search based context (especially when making changes within lines) are used to specify which part of the document is to be edited or displayed.

Early line editors included Expensive Typewriter and QED. Both pre-dated the advent of Unix; the former two ran on DEC PDP-1's, while the latter was a Unisys product. Unix systems offer both ed and ex, the latter typically as a specialized mode of a full-screen editor. For the first 10 years of the IBM PC, the only editor provided in MS-DOS / IBM PC DOS was the Edlin line editor.

Line editors are still used non-interactively in shell scripts and when dealing with failing operating systems. Update systems such as patch traditionally used diff data converted into a script of ed commands. They are also used in many MUD systems, though many people edit text on their own computer using MUDs' download and upload features.
