= GNU nano =

Text editor for Unix-like computing systems

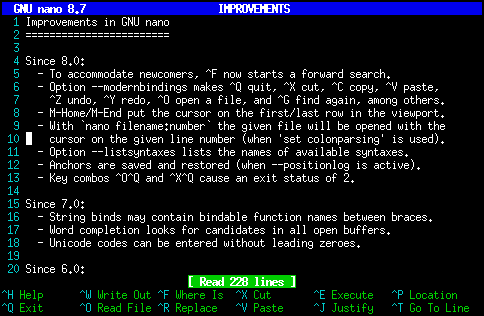
- GNU nano 8.7
- Original author: Chris Allegretta
- Developer: Benno Schulenberg
- Release: 18 November 1999; 26 years ago
- Stable release: 9.2 / 31 July 2026
- Written in: C
- Operating system: Cross-platform
- Included with: GNU based operating systems
- Available in: English
- Type: Text editor
- License: 2007: GPL-3.0-or-later (Note: GPL-3.0-or-later: Since 2.0.7.); 2001: GPL-2.0-or-later (Note: GPL-2.0-or-later: From 1.0.6 and 1.1.3 to 2.0.6.); 1999: GPL-1.0-or-later (Note: GPL-1.0-or-later: TIP 0.5.0 to Nano 1.0.5 and Nano 1.1.2.)
- Website: nano-editor.org
- Repository: git.savannah.gnu.org/cgit/nano.git

GNU nano is a text editor for Unix-like computing systems or operating environments using a command line interface. It emulates the Pico text editor, part of the Pine email client, and also provides additional functionality. Unlike Pico, nano is licensed under the GNU General Public License (GPL). Released as free software by Chris Allegretta in 1999, nano became part of the GNU Project in 2001. The logo resembles the lowercase form of the Greek letter Eta (η).

== History ==
GNU nano was first created in 1999 with the name TIP (a recursive acronym for TIP Isn't Pico), by Chris Allegretta. His motivation was to create a free software replacement for Pico, which was not distributed under a free-software license. The name was changed to nano on January 10, 2000, to avoid a naming conflict with the existing Unix utility tip. The name comes from the system of SI prefixes, in which nano is 1000 times larger than pico. In February 2001, nano became a part of the GNU Project.

GNU nano implements several features that Pico lacks, including syntax highlighting, line numbers, regular expression search and replace, line-by-line scrolling, multiple buffers, indenting groups of lines, rebindable key support, and the undoing and redoing of edit changes.

On 11 August 2003, Chris Allegretta officially handed the source code maintenance of nano to David Lawrence Ramsey. On 20 December 2007, with the release of 2.0.7, Ramsey stepped down as nano's maintainer. The license was also upgraded to GPL-3.0-or-later. The project is currently maintained by Benno Schulenberg.

In version 2.6.0, released in June 2016, the principal developer and other active members of the nano project decided by consensus to leave the GNU Project. Their decision was prompted by objections to the Free Software Foundation's policies, including its requirement for copyright assignment, as well as the belief that decentralized copyright ownership does not impede effective enforcement of the GNU General Public License. The step was acknowledged by Debian and Arch Linux, while the GNU Project resisted the move and called it a "fork". On 19 August 2016, Chris Allegretta announced the return of the project to the GNU family, following concessions from GNU on copyright assignment for Nano specifically, which happened when version 2.7.0 was released in September 2016.

== Control keys ==
GNU nano, like Pico, is keyboard-oriented, controlled with control keys. For example, Ctrl+O saves the current file; Ctrl+W goes to the search menu. GNU nano puts a two-line "shortcut bar" at the bottom of the screen, listing many of the commands available in the current context. For a complete list, Ctrl+G gets the help screen.

Unlike Pico, nano uses meta keys to toggle its behavior. For example, Meta+S toggles soft overlong line wrapping on and off. Almost all features that can be selected from the command line can be dynamically toggled. On keyboards without the meta key it is often mapped to the escape key, Esc, such that in order to simulate, say, Meta+S one has to press the Esc key, then release it, and then press the S key.

GNU nano can also use pointing devices, such as a mouse, to activate functions that are on the shortcut bar, as well as position the cursor.

== See also ==
- Comparison of text editors
- List of text editors
- List of POSIX commands
- Pico (text editor)
