= List of Eclipse-based software =

The Eclipse IDE platform can be extended by adding different plug-ins. Notable examples include:

- Acceleo, an open source code generator that uses EMF-based models to generate any textual language (Java, PHP, Python, etc.).
- Actifsource, a modeling and code generation workbench.
- Adobe ColdFusion Builder, the official Adobe IDE for ColdFusion.
- Adobe Flash Builder (formerly Adobe Flex Builder), an Adobe IDE based on Eclipse for building Flex applications for the Flash Platform and mobile platforms.
- ADT Eclipse plugin developed by Google for the Android SDK.
- AnyLogic, a simulation modeling tool developed by The AnyLogic Company.
- Appcelerator, a cross platform mobile development tool by Axway Appcelerator
- Aptana, Web IDE based on Eclipse
- Avaya Dialog Designer, a commercial IDE to build scripts for voice self-service applications.
- Bioclipse, a visual platform for chemo- and bioinformatics.
- BIRT Project, open source software project that provides reporting and business intelligence capabilities for rich client and web applications.
- Cantata IDE is a computer program for software testing at run time of C and C++ programs.
- CityEngine procedural based city generator.
- Code Composer Studio Texas Instruments' IDE for microcontroller development.
- CodeWarrior Freescale's IDE for microcontrollers, since Version 10 (C/C++/Assembly compilers).
- Compuware OptimalJ, a model-driven development environment for Java
- Coverity Static Analysis, which finds crash-causing defects and security vulnerabilities in code
- DBeaver, universal database manager and SQL client
- ECLAIR, a tool for automatic program analysis, verification, testing and transformation
- EasyEclipse, bundled distributions of the Eclipse IDE
- g-Eclipse, an integrated workbench framework to access the power of existing Grid infrastructures
- GAMA Platform, an integrated development environment for building spatially explicit agent-based simulations
- GForge Advanced Server - Collaboration tool with multiframe view through Eclipse integration for multiple functions
- Google Plugin for Eclipse, Development tools to design, build, optimize and deploy cloud applications to Google App Engine
- GumTree, an integrated workbench for instrument control and data analysis
- IBM Rational Software Architect, supporting design with UML and development of applications. This product replaces some Rational Rose products family.
- IBM Rational Software Modeler is a robust, scalable service for requirements elaboration, design, and general modeling. It supports design with UML. This product replaces some Rational Rose products family.
- IBM Rational Performance Tester is a performance testing tool used to identify the presence and cause of system performance bottlenecks.
- IBM Rational Method Composer, a software development process management and delivery platform
- IBM Rational Publishing Engine, a document generation service
- IBM Lotus Expeditor a client-server platform that provides a framework to develop lightweight rich client applications for desktops and various mobile devices.
- IBM Lotus Symphony a set of applications free of charge: a word processor, a spreadsheet program, and a presentation program, each based on OpenOffice.org
- IBM Notes (since version 8), a client-server collaborative application platform, used for enterprise email and calendaring, as well as for collaborative business applications.
- Intel FPGA (formerly Altera), Nios-II EDS, embedded C/C++ software development environment for Intel Nios-II and ARM processors in the HPS part of SoC FPGA's.
- Kalypso (software), an Open Source software project, that can be used as a general modeling system. It is focused mainly on numerical simulations in water management such as generation of concepts for flood prevention and protection or risk management.
- KNIME, an open source data analytics, reporting and integration platform.
- MontaVista DevRocket, plug-in to Eclipse
- MyEclipse, from Genuitec is an IDE which also enables Angular TypeScript development from within the Java-Eclipse platform using its Webclipse plug-in and Angular IDE service.
- Nuxeo RCP, an open source rich client platform for ECM applications.
- OEPE, Oracle Enterprise Pack for Eclipse.
- OMNeT++, Network Simulation Framework.
- Parasoft C/C++test, an automated C and C++ software testing tool for static analysis, Unit test-case generation and execution, regression testing, runtime error detection, and code review.
- Parasoft Jtest, an automated Java software testing tool for static analysis, Unit test-case generation and execution, regression testing, runtime error detection, and code review.
- Parasoft SOAtest tool suite for testing and validating APIs and API-driven applications (e.g., cloud, mobile apps, SOA).
- Parasoft Virtualize, a service virtualization product that can create, deploy, and manage simulated test environments for software development and software testing purposes.
- PHP Development Tools (or simply PDT) is an open source IDE with basic functions for editing and debugging PHP application.
- PHPEclipse is an open source PHP IDE with integrated debugging, developed and supported by a committed community.
- Polyspace detects and proves the absence of certain run-time errors in source code with a plugin for Eclipse for C, C++, and Ada languages
- Powerflasher FDT is an Eclipse-based integrated development environment for building Flex applications for the Flash Platform and mobile platforms.
- Pulse (ALM) from Genuitec is a free or for-fee service intended for Eclipse tool management and application delivery, collaboration and management.
- PyDev is an Integrated Development Environment (IDE) used for programming in Python supporting code refactoring, graphical debugging, code analysis among other features.
- Red Hat JBoss Developer Studio
- Remote Component Environment is an integration platform for engineers which enables integration, workflow management and data management in a distributed environment.
- Rodin, a tool for software specification and refinement using the B-Method.
- RSSOwl, a Java RSS/RDF/Atom newsreader
- SAP NetWeaver Developer Studio, an IDE for most of the Java part of SAP technology
- Sirius allows creating custom graphical modeling workbenches by leveraging the Eclipse Modeling technologies, including EMF and GMF.
- Spatiotemporal Epidemiological Modeler (STEM), is an open source tool for creating and studying new mathematical models of Infectious Disease.
- SpringSource STS, plugin for Spring framework based development
- Sybase PowerDesigner, a data-modeling and collaborative design tool for enterprises that need to build or re-engineer applications. Teamcenter, from version 2007.1 this Product Lifecycle Management software uses Eclipse as platform.
- Tensilica Xtensa Xplorer, an IDE which integrates software development, processor configuration and optimization, multiple-processor SOC architecture tools and SOC simulation into one common design environment.
- ThreadSafe, a static analysis tool for Java focused on finding and diagnosing concurrency bugs (race conditions, deadlocks, ...)
- uDig, a user-friendly GIS map-making program
- VistaMax IDE for Maemo, a visual Integrated Development Environment based on Eclipse
- VP/MS, Eclipse-based modeling language and product lifecycle management tool by CSC.
- WireframeSketcher, a wireframing tool for desktop, web and mobile applications.
- XMind, a cross-platform mind-mapping/brainstorming/presentation software application.
- Xilinx's EDK (Embedded Development Kit) is the development package for building MicroBlaze (and PowerPC) embedded processor systems in Xilinx FPGAs as part of the Xilinx IDE software (until version 14.7)
- Xilinx SDK as part of the newer Vivado design software package
- Zen Coding, A set of plugins for HTML and CSS hi-speed coding.
- Zend Studio An IDE used for developing PHP websites and web services.

== See also ==
- List of Eclipse projects
- List of Apache Software Foundation projects
- List of free and open-source software organizations
