= WireframeSketcher =

- Developer(s): Petru Severin
- Initial release: 2008; 17 years ago
- Operating system: Windows, macOS, Linux
- Platform: Eclipse (software)
- Type: Software Prototyping
- Website: wireframesketcher.com

WireframeSketcher is a wireframing tool developed by Peter Severin and first released in November 2008. WireframeSketcher software is a member of Eclipse Foundation. It is used for creating wireframes, mockups and prototypes for desktop, web and mobile applications. It allows the designer to create screens by arranging pre-built widgets using a drag-and-drop WYSIWYG editor and then organize screens into interactive storyboards. The application is offered in a desktop version as well as a plug-in for any Eclipse IDE such as Flash Builder, ColdFusion Builder, Aptana, MyEclipse and Zend Studio. WireframeSketcher is a general purpose tool, but it also provides specialized widget libraries for Android, iOS and Windows Phone.

== Awards ==
- WireframeSketcher was a finalist in the Best RCP Application category at EclipseCon 2011.
- WireframeSketcher was a finalist in the Best Developer Tool category at EclipseCon 2013.

== See also ==
- Website wireframe
- Mockup
- Prototyping
- Rapid prototyping
- Rapid Application Development
- Software Prototyping
