= Zend (disambiguation) =

Zend is a Zoroastrian technical term for exegetical glosses, paraphrases, commentaries and translations of the Avesta's texts.

Zend may also refer to:

== Computing ==
- Zend, a computer software company
  - Zend Engine, an open-source scripting engine for the PHP programming language
  - Laminas, a PHP-based web development framework formerly known as Zend Framework
  - Zend Studio, an integrated development environment for PHP
  - Zend Server, a web application server for running PHP applications

== Other uses ==
- Zend language, historical name for the Avestan language
- Salla Zend, a fictional character in Star Wars
