= Contributor license agreement =

Copyright terms

A Contributor License Agreement (CLA) defines the terms under which intellectual property has been contributed to a company/project, typically software under an open source license.

== Rationale ==
CLAs can be used to enable vendors to easily pursue legal resolution in the case of copyright disputes, or to relicense products to which contributions have been received from third parties. CLAs are important especially for corporate open source projects under a copyleft license, since without a CLA the contribution would restrict the guardian as well.

The purpose of a CLA is to ensure that the guardian of a project's outputs has the necessary ownership or grants of rights over all contributions to allow them to distribute under the chosen license, often by granting an irrevocable license to allow the project maintainer to use the contribution; if copyright is actually transferred, the agreement is more normally known as a Copyright Transfer Agreement. CLAs also have roles in raising awareness of IPR issues within a project.

== Relicensing controversy ==
When a CLA requires a contributor to assign unrestricted republishing rights to the project, contributed code can be relicensed at the discretion of the project, even when the CLA does not assign copyright to the project. Prominent open source advocates regard CLAs as dangerous to open source rights.

=== Examples ===
In 2019 MongoDB used these rights granted by its CLA to achieve a move to a non-open-source license.

In January 2021, the Elasticsearch project used such rights to move the project to a non-open-source license arguing Amazon had been "misleading and confusing the community".

[...] Our license change is aimed at preventing companies from taking our Elasticsearch and Kibana products and providing them directly as a service without collaborating with us.

Our license change comes after years of what we believe to be Amazon/AWS misleading and confusing the community - enough is enough.

We’ve tried every avenue available including going through the courts, but with AWS’s ongoing behavior, we have decided to change our license so that we can focus on building products and innovating rather than litigating [...]

== CLAs which restrict relicensing ==
=== Project Harmony ===
Project Harmony was established by Canonical in 2010 to optionally avoid the problems discussed above. It provides a CLA template-builder. Based on choices made, the CLA will allow the contributor to keep copyright and assign rights to the project (as above) but with various restrictions on relicensing: using the template requires choosing one of the mutually-exclusive options, which range in restrictiveness. A real-world example is the Ubuntu project. The CLA leaves copyright with the contributor and allows the project to relicense the code but with a restriction based on the license the contribution was made under:

2.3 Outbound License Based on the grant of rights in Sections 2.1 and 2.2, if We include Your Contribution in a Material, We may license the Contribution under any license, including copyleft, permissive, commercial, or proprietary licenses. As a condition on the exercise of this right, We agree to also license the Contribution under the terms of the license or licenses which We are using for the Material on the Submission Date.

=== Fedora ===
The Fedora Project formerly required contributors to sign a CLA, either as an organization or as an individual. However, this was retired in 2011 and instead contributors must agree to the Fedora Project Contributor Agreement, which is not a license agreement and does not include assignment of copyright.

== Users ==
Companies and projects that use CLAs include:

- .NET Foundation
- Adobe
- Apache Software Foundation
- Canonical Ltd
- Clojure
- Cloud Native Computing Foundation
- CyanogenMod
- Diaspora
- Digia/Qt Project
- Discourse
- Django
- Dojo Toolkit
- eBay Software Foundation, LLC Subsidiary of eBay
- Eclipse
- Elastic
- Element
- Facebook
- Go
- Google
- HashiCorp
- Home Assistant
- InfluxDB
- Joomla
- jQuery
- Kubernetes
- OpenBMC
- Python
- Meteor
- Microsoft
- MuseScore
- OpenMediaVault
- OpenStack
- Puppet
- Salesforce
- Sangoma
- TiddlyWiki
- TLDR Pages
- W3C
- Zed (text editor)
- Zend Technologies for Zend Framework (1.x series only)

=== KDE ===
KDE uses Free Software Foundation Europe's Fiduciary Licence Agreement of which (FLA-1.2) states in section 3.3:

FSFE shall only exercise the granted rights and licences in accordance with the principles of Free Software as defined by the Free Software Foundations. FSFE guarantees to use the rights and licences transferred in strict accordance with the regulations imposed by Free Software licences, including, but not limited to, the GNU General Public Licence (GPL) or the GNU Lesser General Public Licence (LGPL) respectively. In the event FSFE violates the principles of Free Software, all granted rights and licences shall automatically return to the Beneficiary and the licences granted hereunder shall be terminated and expire.

However, it is optional and every contributor is allowed not to assign their copyright to KDE e.V.

== See also ==
- Developer Certificate of Origin
- Know your customer
- Open-core model
