= Andi Gutmans =

Israeli businessman

- אנדי גוטמנס
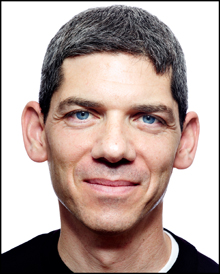
- Gutmans in 2015
- Born: Andrei Gutmans; Basel, Switzerland
- Education: Technion – Israel Institute of Technology (B.Sc. in Computer Science)
- Occupations: Programmer, Entrepreneur
- Known for: Co-creating PHP, Co-founding Zend Technologies
- Title: VP & GM, Data Cloud at Google

Andi (Andrei) Gutmans is an Israeli programmer and entrepreneur.

== Biography ==
Andi Gutmans holds a bachelor’s degree in computer science from the Technion in Haifa. Gutmans holds four citizenships: Swiss, British, Israeli and American.

== Business career ==
Andi Gutmans helped to co-create PHP, and co-founded Zend Technologies and is the GM and VP for Data Cloud at Google. A graduate of the Technion, the Israel Institute of Technology in Haifa, Gutmans and fellow student Zeev Suraski created PHP 3 in 1997. In 1999 they wrote the Zend Engine, the core of PHP 4, and founded Zend Technologies, which has since overseen PHP advances, including the PHP 5 and most recent PHP 7 releases. The name Zend is a portmanteau of their forenames, Zeev and Andi.

Gutmans was CEO of Zend Technologies until October 2015 when Zend was acquired by Rogue Wave Software. Before being appointed CEO in February 2009, he led Zend's R&D including development of all Zend products and Zend's contributions to the open-source Zend Framework and PHP Development Tools projects. He has participated at Zend in its corporate financing and has also led alliances with vendors like Adobe, IBM, Microsoft, and Oracle.

Gutmans was on the board of the Eclipse Foundation (October 2005 – October 2008), is an emeritus member of the Apache Software Foundation, and was nominated for the FSF Award for the Advancement of Free Software in 1999.

In 2004 he wrote a book called "PHP 5 Power Programming" together with Stig Bakken and Derick Rethans.

Gutmans was recognized by ComputerWorld magazine in July 2007 in their article "40 Under 40: 40 Innovative IT People to Watch, Under the Age of 40.”

In March 2016, Gutmans left Rogue Wave to join Amazon Web Services. Explaining his motivations, Gutmans cited "Cloud infrastructure adoption is at a tipping point" and "the data 'center of gravity' is moving to the cloud", where Amazon "appears to effectively balance innovation and invention: a focus on customer value with a bias to action". In his role at Amazon Web Services, Gutmans managed Amazon Elasticsearch Service, Amazon Redshift, Amazon EMR, Amazon Glue, Amazon ElastiCache and Amazon Neptune.

In May 2020, Gutmans joined Google as VP & GM, Databases and now is the VP & GM, Data Cloud, which includes operational databases, analytical data platforms, open lakehouse technologies, and Business Intelligence.
