= Simple Cloud API =

Zend Technologies's API

- Developers: Zend Technologies; Microsoft; IBM; Rackspace; Nirvanix; GoGrid
- Stable release: 0.2
- Written in: PHP
- Operating system: Cross-platform
- Type: Application programming interfaces
- License: New BSD license

The Simple Cloud API is an API (Application Programming Interface). It enables users to access cloud application services written in the PHP programming language across different cloud computing platforms. It was launched in 2009 by Zend Technologies.

== Announcement ==
On September 22, 2009, Zend Technologies announced the Simple Cloud API project for improving portability of PHP applications across all major cloud computing platforms. The announcement attracted much attention from the press with an unusual collaboration among leading cloud computing companies.

== Services ==
The Simple Cloud API is a common API for accessing cloud application services offered by multiple vendors. The following services are supported:

- Storage with adapters for services such as Amazon S3 and Nirvanix
- Document with adapters for services such as Azure Table Storage and Amazon SimpleDB
- Queue with adapters for services such as Amazon SQS and Azure Queue Storage

The API defines interfaces for these services and provides adapters for several vendors' services. Local adapters are also available for offline development.

== Zend Framework Component ==
These interfaces and adapters form a new Zend Framework component called Zend_Cloud. Each service has a corresponding proposal: Zend_Cloud_Storage, Zend_Cloud_Document, and Zend_Cloud_Queue .

All development is currently carried out in the Zend Framework laboratory. All bug reports and comments will be collected on the proposal pages until the API is approved for inclusion in Zend Framework.

== See also ==
- Microsoft Azure
- IBM
- Rackspace
- Nirvanix
- GoGrid
