= Dynamic Languages Toolkit =

DLTK
- Initial release: 29 June 2007; 17 years ago
- Stable release: R6.2 / 2 May 2020; 4 years ago
- Preview release: R6.3 / 11 June 2020; 4 years ago
- Written in: Java
- Operating system: Cross-platform: Linux, Mac OS X, Solaris, Windows
- Platform: Eclipse
- Type: Framework, Integrated development environment (IDE)
- License: Eclipse Public License
- Website: www.eclipse.org/dltk/

DLTK (Dynamic Languages Toolkit) — is a tool for vendors, researchers, and end-users who rely on dynamic languages. DLTK is a set of extensible frameworks designed to reduce the complexity of building full featured development environments for dynamic languages such as PHP and Perl. Besides a set of frameworks DLTK provides exemplary Tcl, Ruby, Javascript and Python development environments.

== History ==
In 2005 Xored Software inc. proposed Eclipse Dynamic Languages Toolkit Project to the Eclipse Foundation and it was approved in 2006. In 2007 Eclipse DLTK was released as a part of Eclipse Europa. From that moment on, every Eclipse Simultaneous Release comprises a new version of DLTK. Since its very first release, DLTK has been used in various open-source and commercial Eclipse-based development projects.

CodeGear releases commercial version of (3rdRail) development framework (IDE) for Ruby language and Ruby on Rails framework based on DLTK. Zend Technologies leading PDT (PHP Development tools) project sets DLTK base starting from 1.1 version.

== See also ==
- Xtext
