= Project Harmony =

Project Harmony may refer to:

- Project Harmony (licensing), an initiative concerning Open Source software
- Apache Harmony was an Apache Software foundation project to create a FOSS Java implementation
