= Gliffy =

Gliffy is software for diagramming via an HTML5 cloud-based app. It is used to create UML diagrams, floor plans, Venn diagrams, flowcharts and various other kinds of diagrams online. Gliffy diagrams can be shared with and edited by users in real time. The SaaS is supported in all modern web-browsers, including Google Chrome, Firefox, Safari and Internet Explorer 9+.

Gliffy's developer, the self-funded company Gliffy, Inc., was acquired by Rogue Wave Software in October 2018, and Rogue Wave was subsequently acquired by Perforce Software in January 2019.

== History ==
Gliffy was founded in 2005 by friends and former coworkers, Chris Kohlhardt and Clint Dickson. The two software engineers saw a need for an online diagramming tool and decided to leave their full-time jobs and start a company to develop it.

Kohlhardt contacted Mike Cannon-Brookes, one of the founders of Atlassian, an Australian enterprise software company. With his encouragement, Kohlhardt and Dickson created a Gliffy plugin for Atlassian’s collaboration product Confluence, and business took off.

In May 2006, Gliffy announced its public beta and by 2007 the beta was removed. In 2009, a new Gliffy plugin for Atlassian's JIRA product was unveiled and in 2010 Gliffy was added to the Google Apps marketplace.

In 2012, Gliffy moved to an all HTML5 platform, at the same time adding Visio support. Gliffy integrates with Google Apps, Google Drive, JIRA, and Confluence, and has over 18 million registered users.

It was acquired by Rogue Wave Software in October 2018, which was then acquired by Perforce in January 2019.

== Timeline ==
- August 2006: Gliffy adds UML shapes
- November 2006: Gliffy Plugin for Atlassian Confluence unveiled
- February 2007: Beta removed
- January 2009: Gliffy Plugin for Atlassian Jira unveiled
- July 2010: Gliffy added to Google Apps marketplace
- January 2012: Gliffy reaches 1 million users
- June 2012: Gliffy joins the Atlassian Marketplace
- October 2012: Gliffy moves to HTML5
- October 2018: Gliffy is acquired by Rogue Wave Software
- January 2019: Gliffy is acquired by Perforce Software

== Features ==
Gliffy features a drag-and-drop interface and real-time online collaboration and sharing capabilities. It allows users to export their diagrams in multiple formats including: PDF, JPEG, PNG and SVG. It is supported in all modern web browsers, including Google Chrome, Firefox, Safari, and Internet Explorer 9+.

Additional features:

- Interactive diagrams allow viewers to show and hide layers of information
- Fully searchable diagram text
- Embedded versions of diagrams automatically update

Gliffy integrates with Google Apps, Google Drive, Jira, and Confluence.
