= EasyEclipse =

EasyEclipse is an open-source software project hosted in SourceForge that provides several bundled distributions of the Eclipse IDE pre-configured with plug-ins for special purposes such as Python programming, Ruby on Rails, etc. It is released under CPL, EPL and OSL.

It was established in 2005 as a response to a perceived descent into Eclipse Download Hell, a journey to collect components for an individual developer's successful project, similar to DLL Hell. As the original Eclipse project's distribution improved, this project died off in 2011, except for an attempted respite with a new sponsor in 2014 that failed its Kickstarter funding.

== See also ==
- List of Eclipse-based software
