= Adobe ColdFusion Builder =

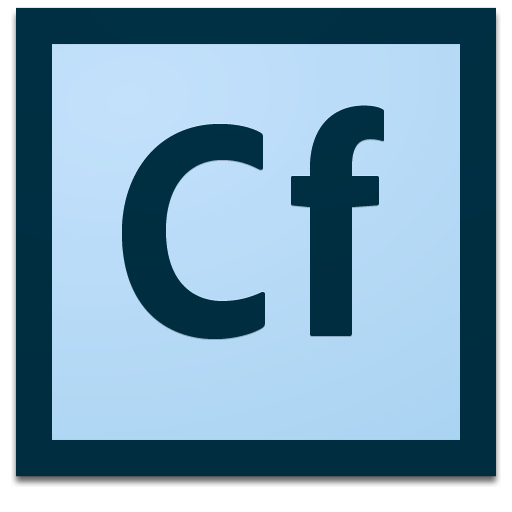
- Developer: Adobe Systems
- Stable release: 2018 (v3.2.1)
- Operating system: Windows, Mac, Linux
- Website: adobe.com/products/coldfusion-builder

Adobe ColdFusion Builder is the name for Adobe's Eclipse-based development IDE that can be used to build applications for ColdFusion. The product's original codename, "Bolt", is a reference to the original lightning icon for ColdFusion from the Allaire days. Adobe officially released the IDE in 2010 under the name Adobe ColdFusion Builder.

== History ==
Adobe ColdFusion Builder became available on 22 March 2010, alongside Flash Builder 4. The IDE was designed to provide a dedicated development environment for ColdFusion applications, integrating coding, debugging, and server management tools within the Eclipse framework.

In subsequent releases, Adobe expanded the IDE's functionality with improved code navigation, debugging support, and broader platform compatibility.

== Version history ==
=== Adobe ColdFusion Builder 1.0 ===
The initial release focused on establishing a dedicated development environment for ColdFusion developers. It introduced integrated code assistance for CFML, basic refactoring capabilities, server management integration, and line-level debugging. Built on the Eclipse platform, version 1.0 emphasized extensibility through plugins, providing a base for subsequent feature development.

=== Adobe ColdFusion Builder 2.0 ===
ColdFusion Builder 2.0 (codename "Storm") was previewed at Adobe MAX 2010 and officially released on 3 May 2011. This version expanded the core feature set introduced in 1.0, adding improvements to code navigation, searching, and formatting, as well as enhancements to code assist and configurable code folding.

=== Adobe ColdFusion Builder 3.0 ===
ColdFusion Builder 3.0 (codename "Thunder") was released on 29 April 2014. The release expanded support for mobile and multi-device development, introduced on-device debugging capabilities, and added Linux platform support.

=== Adobe ColdFusion Builder 2016 ===
ColdFusion Builder 2016 (3.1.3.300344) was officially released on February 16, 2016.

=== Adobe ColdFusion Builder 2018 ===
ColdFusion Builder 2018 (version 3.2.0) was released on 12 July 2018. An update to version 3.2.1.313943 followed on 4 February 2019.

== See also ==
- Adobe Dreamweaver - non-CF specific web development IDE
- HomeSite - previous official editor for CF.
- List of Eclipse-based software
