= Surround SCM =

Version control software

- Developer: Perforce
- Release: September 2002; 24 years ago
- Stable release: 2021.1.2 / December 17, 2021; 4 years ago
- Operating system: Microsoft Windows, Linux, Mac OS X
- Type: Revision control
- License: Proprietary
- Website: www.perforce.com/products/surround-scm

Surround SCM is a software configuration management application developed by Seapine Software, now owned by Perforce since 2017. Perforce integrated the software with its Helix ALM product.

== Architecture ==
Surround SCM has a client–server architecture. The server manages a central database of file versions and branches. Users work on files on their local hard drive and submit changed files together in changelists. The client and server communicate via a TCP/IP connection using 512-bit encryption.

=== Server ===
Surround SCM stores data in an industry-standard relational database management system. The database contains both the file contents and metadata (file state, file attributes, branching and merging history, changelists, filters, users, groups, labels, etc.). A proxy server can optionally be installed to improve performance of file retrievals for distributed teams.

=== Clients ===
There are several different categories of Surround SCM clients: GUI, CLI, API, Web UI, and plugin.

The cross-platform GUI client is developed with Qt and available on Windows, Mac OS X, and Linux. It fully supports all end-user operations and administration operations.

The command line interface (CLI) is also available on Windows, Mac OS X, and Linux. The CLI can be used in any command shell or script. Build scripts generally access Surround SCM files via the CLI.

Surround SCM’s open API allows users to write applications that access branches, repositories, and files on the Surround SCM Server using the C, Java, and .Net programming languages.

The plugin interfaces integrate Surround SCM client functionality into third-party applications. Surround SCM plugins are available for Eclipse, IntelliJ IDEA, KDevelop, Visual Studio, NetBeans, JDeveloper, PowerBuilder, WebStorm, Windows Explorer, Mac OS X Finder, Linux file system, Bugzilla, JIRA, Microsoft TFS, TestTrack, Ant, NAnt, Hudson, Jenkins, TeamCity, CruiseControl, CruiseControl.NET, Dreamweaver, FinalBuilder, Microsoft Office, and QA Wizard.

== Release history ==
Major release versions of Surround SCM, along with their release dates:

- version 1.0 (September 3, 2002)
- version 1.1 (October 1, 2002)
- version 1.2 (January 29, 2003)
- version 1.5 (April 21, 2003)
- version 2.0 (August 26, 2003)
- version 2.1 (December 15, 2003)
- version 3.0 (August 2, 2004)
- version 3.1 (February 7, 2005)
- version 4.0 (July 19, 2005)
- version 4.1 (January 30, 2006)
- version 5.0 (November 2, 2006)
- version 2008.0 (October 9, 2007)
- version 2008.1 (April 21, 2008)
- version 2009.0 (February 5, 2009)
- version 2009.1 (June 30, 2009)
- version 2010.0 (November 16, 2009)
- version 2010.1 (May 3, 2010)
- version 2011.0 (October 21, 2010)
- version 2011.1 (June 1, 2011)
- version 2012.0 (February 9, 2012)
- version 2012.1 (March 9, 2012)
- version 2013.0 (October 22, 2012)
- version 2013.1 (March 20, 2013)
- version 2013.2 (September 12, 2013)
- version 2014.0 (March 14, 2014)
- version 2014.1 (September 5, 2014)
- version 2015.0 (December 17, 2014)
- version 2015.1 (September 8, 2015)
- version 2016.0 (April 11, 2016)
- version 2016.1 (October 6, 2016)
- version 2017.1 (April 24, 2017)
- version 2017.2 (September 18, 2017)
- version 2018.1 (March 5, 2018)
- version 2018.2 (August 30, 2018)
- version 2019.1 (February 11, 2019)
- version 2019.2 (October 15, 2019)
- version 2020.1 (May 26, 2020)
- version 2021.1 (July 28, 2021)

== Features ==
Surround SCM features include:

- Branching and merging
- File and change set labeling
- Graphical file history
- Changelist and atomic transactions
- Filters
- Search file contents
- Shelves
- Configurable workflow
- Email notifications
- Custom fields
- Code review capabilities
- Role-based security groups
- Single sign-on
- Data stored in an RDBMS
- External reports
- Cross-platform GUI and CLI
- Electronic signatures
- Automatic client upgrades
- Proxy server
- Shadow folders

== Awards ==
In 2008 Surround SCM won a Jolt Award in the Change and Configuration Management category.

== See also ==
- Comparison of revision control software
- List of revision control software
