= Oracle Enterprise Pack for Eclipse =

Eclipse Enterprise Pack from Oracle

Oracle Enterprise Pack for Eclipse (OEPE)
- Developer: Oracle
- Platform: Java SE, Java EE, Oracle WebLogic Server
- Website: link

OEPE is the acronym for Oracle Enterprise Pack for Eclipse, a set of Eclipse plugins to facilitate development of Java SE, Java EE, Web service, ORM, and Spring applications on Oracle WebLogic Server. The latest version of OEPE 12.2.1.10 is tested to be working with Eclipse JEE 2020-06.
