= Eric Pulier =

- Education: Harvard University
- Occupation: Entrepreneur

Eric Pulier is an American entrepreneur based in Los Angeles, California.

== Early life and education ==
Pulier was raised in Teaneck, New Jersey, where he attended Teaneck High School, graduating in 1984. He began programming computers in the fourth grade and started a database computer company in high school. Pulier began studying at Harvard University in 1984. He majored in English and American literature, was an editor and wrote a column for The Harvard Crimson, and took classes at neighboring school MIT. He graduated magna cum laude in 1988.

== Career ==
Pulier moved to Los Angeles in 1991, where he founded People Doing Things (PDT), a company that addressed health care, education, and other issues through the use of technology. In 1994, he founded the interactive agency Digital Evolution. The company merged with US Interactive LLC in 1998. Pulier led the effort to build Starbright World, a private social network for chronically ill children where they can chat, blog, post content and meet others who share similar experiences.

In 1997, the Presidential Inaugural Committee selected Pulier to create and execute the Presidential Technology Exhibition in Washington D.C. called "The Bridge to the 21st Century." Following the exhibition, he participated in then-Vice President Al Gore's health care and technology forum and advised on health care and technology initiatives. Pulier is also a supporter and participant with the Clinton Global Initiative.

Pulier founded numerous other ventures, including Vatom, Desktone, Media Platform, Akana, and others. He also co-authored Understanding Enterprise SOA, a book on service-oriented architecture. He is a former board member of Genius Group.

== Legal issues ==
On 13 April 2015, Pulier resigned from CSC following a scandal related to his selling of the company ServiceMesh to CSC and was subsequently indicted for bribery in 2017. Criminal charges were dismissed with prejudice in 2018. In a related civil action brought by the U.S. Securities and Exchange Commission, Pulier, without admitting or denying the allegations, consented in 2021 to a judgment of $4.8 million.

In Australia, Commonwealth Bank of Australia IT executives Keith Hunter and Jon Waldron were charged with receiving bribes. Hunter pleaded guilty in 2016 and was sentenced to 3.5 years in prison. In May 2024, Waldron was convicted of accepting AUD$3M in bribes; reporting on the judgment stated that Pulier made the payments through ACE Inc, a company he had registered.
