= Seapine Software =

Seapine Software Inc
- Company type: Private
- Industry: Computer software, Application lifecycle management
- Founded: 1995
- Founder: Rick Riccetti
- Headquarters: Cincinnati, Ohio
- Number of employees: 100+
- Parent: Perforce Software
- Website: www.seapine.com

Seapine Software was a privately held Mason, Ohio-based software and services company. The company developed a suite of software products that managed the full software development lifecycle. Seapine's tools included testing tools, configuration management, test-case management, and requirements management. The company was best known for its TestTrack line of application lifecycle management (ALM) software.

The company was acquired in 2016 by Minneapolis, Minnesota-based Perforce Software, and TestTrack was rebranded as Helix ALM.

== History ==
Seapine was established in 1995 by Rick and Kelly Riccetti. The company shipped their first product, TestTrack Pro, in 1996.

In 2012, Seapine built a new 50,000 square-foot technology headquarters in Mason, OH for their 100+ employees.

In 2016, the company was acquired by Minneapolis, Minnesota-based Perforce Software. Six months after the acquisition, Perforce renamed TestTrack as Helix ALM to match other products in Perforce's suite.

=== Awards and recognition ===
Seapine was on the SD Times 100 list in 2006, 2007, 2008, 2009, 2010, 2011, 2012, 2013, 2014, and 2015.

In 2013, Seapine was rated a Champion in the application lifecycle management space by Info-Tech Research Group.

Seapine products had won various Jolt Awards, including its QA Wizard in 2011, Surround SCM in 2008, and TestTrack Studio in 2007.

== See also ==
- List of revision control software
- Comparison of issue tracking systems
