= The Linkup =

Defunct file storage website

- TheLinkup.com Main Interface
- Developer: Streamload
- Operating system: Any (Web-based application)
- Type: Web productivity tools
- License: Proprietary
- Website: thelinkup.com

The Linkup (formerly MediaMax), a spin-off from Streamload (now Nirvanix), was a "social network for file sharing" and a service that let users send, receive, and store large amounts of data via the web. It was one of the first Internet based storage services (winning numerous awards) and is now one of the largest failures resulting in user data loss.

== Failures ==
On June 15, 2007 a system administrator's script accidentally misidentified and deleted "good data" along with the "dead data" of some 3.5 million former user accounts and files. It took until October 2007 to complete a partial restore of the data (much of it being irretrievably lost).

The Linkup finally experienced a "meltdown" on July 10, 2008 which left about 20,000 paying subscribers without their digital music, video, and photo files from August 8, 2008. In the site's place is a message saying We're sorry, but MediaMax and The Linkup are now closed. with an affiliate link to competitor Box.net.

== See also ==
- Nirvanix (formerly Streamload) is the company from which The Linkup was spun off and which hosted the data
- Savvis is the company responsible for the application and database.
