= Klocwork =

Static code analysis software

- Original author: Klocwork
- Developer: Perforce
- Stable release: Klocwork 2021.4
- Type: static code analysis
- License: Proprietary commercial software
- Website: www.perforce.com/products/klocwork

Klocwork is a static code analysis tool owned by Minneapolis, Minnesota-based software developer Perforce. Klocwork software analyzes source code in real time, simplifies peer code reviews, and extends the life of complex software.

== Overview ==
Klocwork is used to identify security, safety and reliability issues in C, C++, C#, Java, JavaScript and Python code. The product includes numerous desktop plug-ins for developers, metrics and reporting.

== History ==
Originally Klocwork’s technology was developed to address requirements for large-scale source code analysis to optimize software architecture for C code inside Nortel Networks and spun out in 2001.

In January 2012, Klocwork Insight 9.5 was released. It provided on-the-fly static analysis in Visual Studio, like a word processor does with spelling mistakes.

In May 2013, Klocwork Cahoots peer code review tool was launched.

=== Awards and recognition ===
In 2007, Klocwork was awarded the 2007 InfoWorld Technology of Year award for best source code analyzer.

In May 2014, Klocwork won the Red Herring Top 100 North America Award, in the software sector.

== Original developer ==
Klocwork (company)
- Company type: Private
- Industry: Software testing
- Founded: 2001
- Defunct: January 22, 2019
- Headquarters: Ottawa, Canada
- Products: Klocwork
- Website: www.klocwork.com

Klocwork was an Ottawa, Canada-based software company that developed the Klocwork brand of programming tools for software developers. The company was acquired by Minneapolis-based application software developer Perforce in 2019, as part of their acquisition of Klocwork's parent software company Rogue Wave. Klocwork no longer exists as a standalone company, but Perforce continues to develop Klocwork branded static code analysis software.

=== Company history ===
The company was founded in 2001 as a spin-out of Nortel Networks. Its initial investors were Firstmark Capital, USVP, and Mobius Ventures.

In January 2014, the company was acquired by Rogue Wave Software.

In January 2019, Rogue Wave was acquired by Minneapolis-based application software developer Perforce.
