= Akana =

American computer software product company

- Type: Private
- Industry: Computer software
- Founded: 2001
- Founder: Eric Pulier
- Headquarters: Minneapolis, Minnesota, United States
- Key people: Mark Ties, Perforce CEO
- Products: API Analytics; API Gateway; API Management; Developer Portal; Lifecycle Manager; SOLA
- Parent: Perforce
- Website: www.akana.com

Akana is a provider of computer software products for application programming interface (API) management. The company was founded by serial entrepreneur Eric Pulier as SOA Software. In November 2016, Akana was acquired by Rogue Wave Software. In January 2019, Rogue Wave was acquired by Minneapolis-based application software developer Perforce.

== History ==
Akana was founded by serial entrepreneur Eric Pulier in 2001 as SOA Software.

In September 2004, the company acquired enterprise SOA company Flamenco Networks.

In March 2005, the company changed its name to SOA Software. In December, the company bought an internal mainframe web services product called X4ML from Merrill Lynch. The product was renamed SOLA.

In May 2006, the company acquired Blue Titan, a web services networking company.

In May 2008, the company acquired LogicLibrary, an SOA Repository and Governance vendor.

In March 2015, the company changed its name to Akana, as the company expanded its product line away from its SOA and web services roots and into API management.

In November 2016, Louisville, Colorado-based software development company Rogue Wave Software acquired Akana.

In January 2019, Rogue Wave was acquired by Minneapolis-based application software developer Perforce.

== Products ==
Akana's products allow companies to create and manage APIs across multiple platforms, including with legacy mainframe applications, and to collaborate with external developer teams.

- API Analytics - Akana's API Analytics platform is used to collect and analyze metadata related to API usage.
- API Gateway – Akana's API Gateway allows the development and management of APIs across platforms, such as adding support for Microsoft services.
- API Management - Akana's end-to-end API management platform is used to create, secure manage and monitor APIs.
- Developer Portal - Akana's Developer Portal allows internal and external API developer teams to work as a community with features such as role based access control.
- Lifecycle Manager – Akana's API Lifecycle Manager product helps enterprises better integrate APIs with IT policies and business activities and processes.
- SOLA - SOLA is Akana's software for integrating mainframe applications with APIs.

== See also ==
- Application programming interface
