= Helix ALM =

Software developed by Perforce

- Developer(s): Perforce
- Initial release: March 1996; 29 years ago
- Stable release: 2021.2.0 / July 12, 2021; 3 years ago
- Operating system: Microsoft Windows, Linux, Mac OS X
- Type: Bug tracking system, project management software
- License: Proprietary
- Website: www.perforce.com/products/helix-alm

Helix ALM, formerly called TestTrack, is application lifecycle management (ALM) software developed by Perforce. The software allows developers to manage requirements, defects, issues and testing during software development.

== History ==
Helix ALM's precursor, TestTrack Pro, was developed by Seapine Software, and first shipped in 1996. In November 2016, Perforce acquired Seapine, and rebranded the software as Helix ALM.

== Functionality ==
The software tracks software development processes including feature requests and requirements to design revisions and actual changes in the code. It keeps track of what tests were done, what was tested, who performed the test and when, on what platform, under which configuration and in what language. It offers the ability to create, manage, and link artifacts from the beginning through the end of a design and development project providing end-to-end traceability of all development artifacts and giving managers a better handle on the shifting requirements that define their projects. It enforces regulatory compliance to meet regulatory compliance requirements, including 21 CFR Part 11 and Sarbanes-Oxley.

== Architecture ==
Helix ALM has a client–server architecture. The server manages a central database of requirements, test cases, testing evidence, defects, feature requests, work items, test configurations, users, and security group. The client and server communicate via a TCP/IP connection using 512-bit encryption.

=== Server ===
Helix ALM stores data in a variety of relational database management systems including SQL Server, Oracle, and Postgres.

=== Clients ===
There are several different categories of Helix ALM clients: GUI, Web UI, SOAP, REST API, and plugin.

The cross-platform GUI client is developed with Qt and available on Windows, Mac OS X, and Linux. It fully supports all end-user operations and administration operations.

The unified web application allows software developers and testers to create and review requirements, work with issues, and execute and track tests from their web browser.

Helix ALM's SOAP SDK allows language and platform independent way to extend built-in functionality by writing applications that access and manipulate its data.

The plugin interfaces integrate with popular IDEs to perform functionality, such as closing a defect or manually assign a work item to another team member, from the third-party applications. Helix ALM plugins are available for Eclipse, Visual Studio, Outlook, Excel, and QA Wizard. Helix ALM also integrates with various SCM tools including Git, CVS, Perforce, Subversion, Surround SCM, and SourceSafe.

== See also ==
- Comparison of issue tracking systems
