= Zeev Suraski =

Israeli computer scientist (born 1976)

- זאב סורסקי
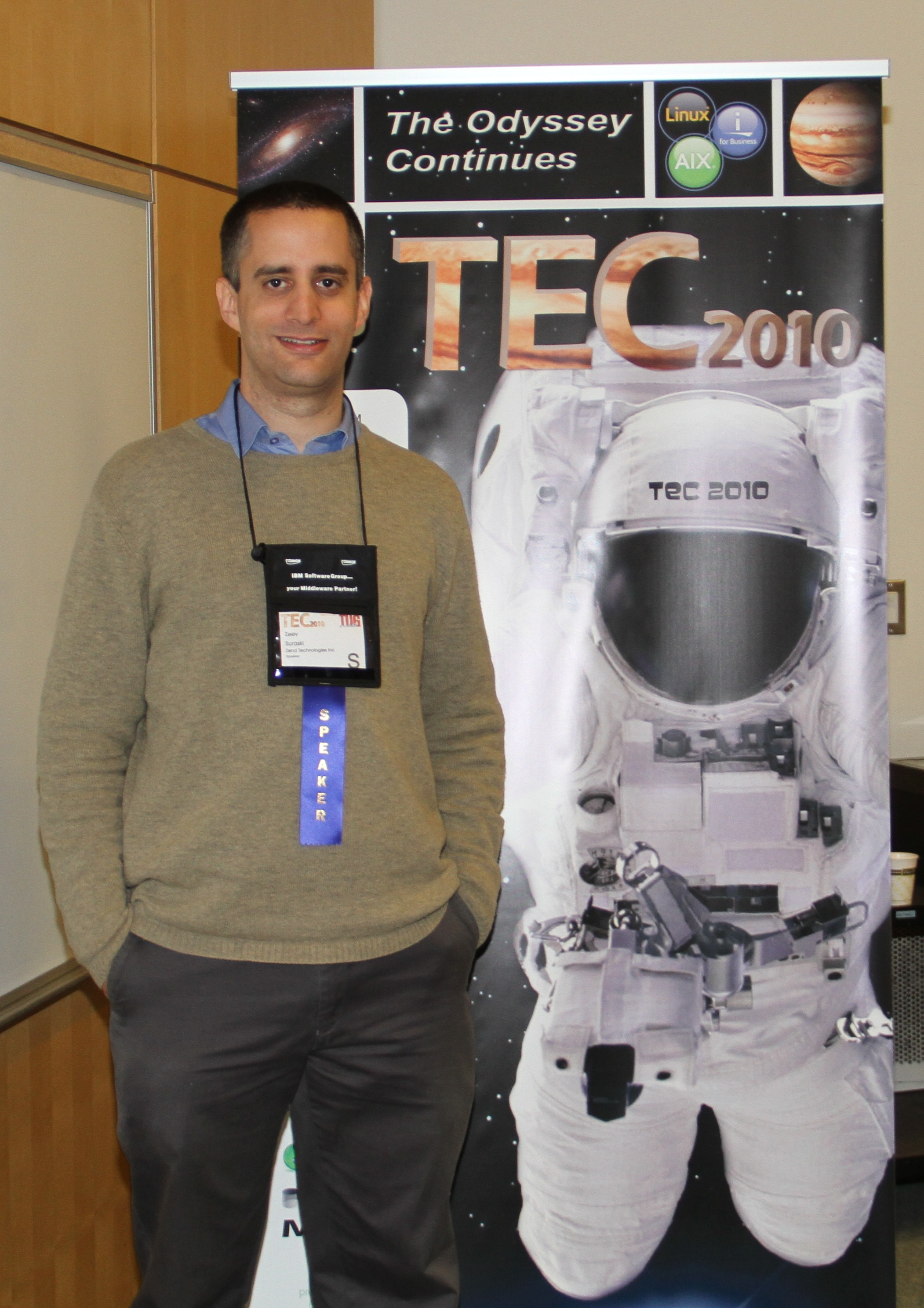
- Born: 18 February 1976 (age 50)
- Occupations: Programmer, PHP developer
- Known for: Co-creator of PHP, Co-founder of Zend Technologies
- Notable work: PHP 3, Zend Engine
- Awards: Nominee for the FSF Award for the Advancement of Free Software (1999)

Zeev Suraski (Hebrew: זאב סורסקי pronounced [ze-ev so-raski]; born 18 February 1976) is an Israeli programmer, PHP developer and co-founder of Zend Technologies. A graduate of the Technion in Haifa, Israel, Suraski and Andi Gutmans created PHP 3 in 1997. In 1999 they wrote the Zend Engine, the core of PHP 4, and founded Zend Technologies, which has since overseen PHP advances. The name Zend is a portmanteau of their forenames, Zeev and Andi.

Suraski is an emeritus member of the Apache Software Foundation, and was nominated for the FSF Award for the Advancement of Free Software in 1999. Suraski was chief technology officer of Zend Technologies. In October 2018 he announced that he would leave the company, after Rogue Wave Software, which had acquired Zend in 2015, decided to change its strategic focus.

He later became chief technology officer of Strattic, a Jerusalem-based developer of WordPress hosting technology. In 2022 Strattic was acquired by Elementor.

He was the lead contributor to PHP from 1997 onwards.
