= Pulse (ALM) =

Pulse is now Secure Delivery Center 2014, a proprietary application lifecycle management (ALM) technology developed and maintained by Genuitec, a founding and strategic member of the Eclipse Foundation.

Pulse is built on top of the Eclipse Equinox (OSGi)/p2 platform, and integrates both proprietary and open source software for software delivery, release management and collaboration environment.

The current version of Pulse is named Secure Delivery Center.

Pulse had three primary versions: Pulse Private Label, a software delivery, collaboration and management product. Pulse Private Label is a white-label product for building custom installation (computer programs) of software using the Internet as the channel.

Genuitec's MyEclipse has been made available via Pulse, now Secure Delivery Center along with Fortune 500 software and hardware vendors, enterprise CRM vendors, and electronic travel vendors that use Secure Delivery Center to distribute proprietary software.

Other notable ALM vendors include IBM Rational Team Concert and HP Quality Center.
