= Developer Certificate of Origin =

Submission process for Linux Kernel programs

The Developer Certificate of Origin (DCO) is a statement that a software developer affirms when modifying the code of free and open-source software. Software distributed with a free and open-source license typically contains contributions from multiple intellectual property rights holders. Each contributor retains the copyright to their work while agreeing to license their modification to others under the terms of the original software license. The Developer Certificate of Origin is an attestation by the contributor that they are, or have been authorized by, the intellectual property rights holder to contribute the modification publicly.

The Developer Certificate of Origin was introduced in 2004 by the Linux Foundation as part of the submission process for software used in the Linux kernel after the SCO–Linux disputes. A DCO identifies the person who claims to hold legal liability for specific lines of code, which could assign liability in legal litigation and may deter someone from submitting code likely to cause legal issues.

The Developer Certificate of Origin differs from a Contributor License Agreement (CLA) in that a CLA is a signed legal contract that typically requires a contributor to assign copyright ownership to a specific entity or to license their contribution to a specific entity with more permissive terms than the free and open source license the software is distributed under. Proponents of the Developer Certificate of Origin contend that it is a lower barrier to contribution compared to a CLA.

For projects using Git version control, the attestation is a footer in the commit message added by using the -s | --signoff command-line option.

Developer Certificate of Origin
Version 1.1

Copyright (C) 2004, 2006 The Linux Foundation and its contributors.
1 Letterman Drive
Suite D4700
San Francisco, CA, 94129

Everyone is permitted to copy and distribute verbatim copies of this
license document, but changing it is not allowed.


Developer's Certificate of Origin 1.1

By making a contribution to this project, I certify that:

(a) The contribution was created in whole or in part by me and I
    have the right to submit it under the open source license
    indicated in the file; or

(b) The contribution is based upon previous work that, to the best
    of my knowledge, is covered under an appropriate open source
    license and I have the right under that license to submit that
    work with modifications, whether created in whole or in part
    by me, under the same open source license (unless I am
    permitted to submit under a different license), as indicated
    in the file; or

(c) The contribution was provided directly to me by some other
    person who certified (a), (b) or (c) and I have not modified
    it.

(d) I understand and agree that this project and the contribution
    are public and that a record of the contribution (including all
    personal information I submit with it, including my sign-off) is
    maintained indefinitely and may be redistributed consistent with
    this project or the open source license(s) involved.

== Notable projects using Developer Certificates of Origin ==
- cert-manager
- The GCC Project
- The Linux Foundation
- Pi-hole
