= EventManager =

- Developer: Kent House
- Stable release: 4.1 / 1 May 2010
- Type: Event management software, SaaS
- License: SaaS
- Website: kenthouse.com/event-management

EventManager was a commercial event management app, developed, licensed, and supported by UK-based Kent House based at Keele University.

The product was first developed in 2003 for use within the UK National Health Service (NHS). It was adopted widely within the NHS and also by commercial and not-for profit organisations to support their event management activity.

In 2008 EventManager won a Medilink West Midlands award for its contribution to delivering efficiencies in the NHS.

EventManager was featured as a case study in The Internet Case Study Book published in 2010 by Taschen.

The product is no longer available.
