= PyDev =

Eclipse plugin for Python

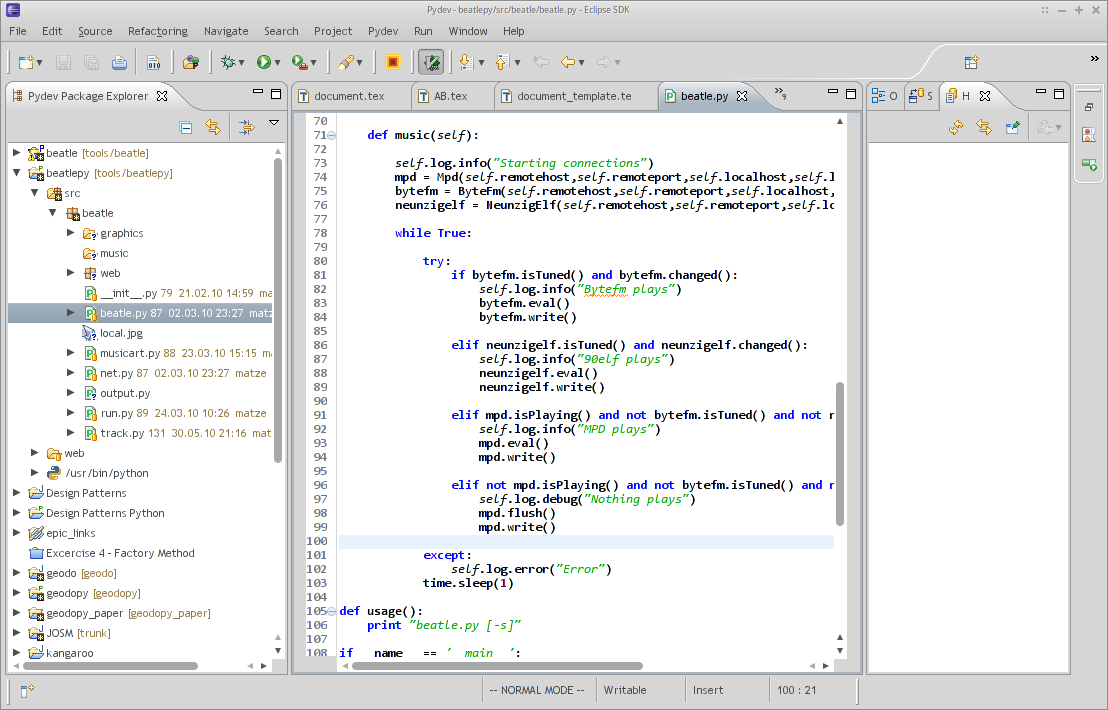
- Original author: Aleks Totic
- Developer: Appcelerator
- Initial release: July 2003; 22 years ago
- Stable release: 13.1.0 / 21 September 2025; 7 months ago
- Written in: Java, Python
- Operating system: Cross-platform
- Type: Integrated development environment
- License: Eclipse Public License
- Website: pydev.org
- Repository: github.com/fabioz/Pydev

PyDev is a third-party plug-in for Eclipse. It is an Integrated Development Environment (IDE) used for programming in Python supporting code refactoring, graphical debugging, code analysis among other features.

== History ==
PyDev was originally created by Aleks Totic in July 2003, but Fabio Zadrozny became the project's main developer in January 2005. In September of that same year, PyDev Extensions was started as a commercial counterpart of PyDev, offering features such as code analysis and remote debugging.

In July 2008, Aptana acquired PyDev, retaining Zadrozny as the project head. They open sourced PyDev Extensions in September 2009, and merged it with PyDev.

When Appcelerator acquired Aptana in January 2011, they acquired PyDev by extension. Zadrozny was kept as head of the project. Since then, development of PyDev has accelerated.

In March 2011, PyDev 2.0 was released with TDD actions support, and in April of the following year, version 2.5 was released with Django support. May 2013 saw a major milestone as PyDev raised more than its target in a successful crowd sourcing round to continue development, and version 2.7.5 was released. The campaign also funded Zadrozny's creation of LiClipse, a paid closed source fork of Eclipse which bundles PyDev by default.

PyDev received improvements to type inference and a notable increase in contributions to code base when version 2.8 was released in July 2013. Since then, numerous additional improvements have been made to PyDev and it has gained many positive reviews.

Version 5.4.0 was released on November 30, 2016. The main new feature of this release is support for Python 3.6.

== Features ==
Below there are some of the features available (version 2.7.5):

- CPython, Jython and IronPython support
- Code completion
- Code completion with auto-import
- Code analysis (with quick-fix for problems found in code analysis—Ctrl+1)
- Debugger
- Django
- Remote Debugger (allows debugging scripts not launched from within Eclipse)
- Debug console (allows interactive probing in suspended mode)
- Interactive console
- Python 2.x and 3.x syntax
- Basic syntax highlighting
- Parser errors
- Outline view
- Tabs or spaces preferences
- Smart indent / dedent
- Comment / uncomment / comment blocks
- Code folding
- Go to definition
- Code coverage
- Mark occurrences
- Pylint integration
- TODO tasks
- Content Assistants (Ctrl+1)
  - Assign result to attribute or local
  - Surround code with try..catch / finally
  - Create docstring
  - Move import to global scope
- Keywords presented as auto-completions as you type
- Quick-outline

== PyDev extensions ==
Until September 2009, two versions of PyDev existed: an open-source version, and a shareware version called PyDev Extensions. Certain advanced features such as code analysis, quick-fixes, and remote debugging were reserved for the non-free version. On September 3, 2009, Aptana announced PyDev version 1.5, a combined version of PyDev and PyDev Extensions, all available under the Eclipse Public License.

== See also ==
- Eclipse
- Comparison of Python integrated development environments
- Komodo Edit
- PyCharm
