= MyEclipse =

- Developer: Genuitec
- Stable release: 2019
- Operating system: Microsoft Windows, Linux and Mac OS
- Type: Integrated development environment
- Website: www.myeclipseide.com China: www.myeclipsecn.com

MyEclipse is a commercially available Java EE IDE created and maintained by the company Genuitec, a founding member of the Eclipse Foundation.

MyEclipse is built upon the Eclipse platform, and integrates both proprietary and open source code into the development environment.

MyEclipse has two primary versions (apart from the Blue Edition, Spring Edition, and Bling Edition referred to below): a Professional and a Standard edition. The Standard edition adds database tools, a visual web designer, persistence tools, Spring tools, Struts and JSF tooling, and a number of other features to the basic Eclipse Java Developer profile. It competes with the Web Tools Project, which is a part of Eclipse itself, but MyEclipse is a separate project entirely and offers a different feature set.

MyEclipse is available via two production-grade streams. The Continuous Integration (CI) stream includes the latest features and fixes, while the Stable stream has less frequent updates and includes only time-tested CI stream updates.

MyEclipse has also been made available via Secure Delivery Center, a technology that grew from its Pulse (ALM), brand, a provisioning tool that maintains Eclipse software profiles, including those that use MyEclipse. Additionally, MyEclipse is offering a customized version for IBM products, "MyEclipse Blue Edition", that adds specific support for Rational Software and WebSphere development. Currently, MyEclipse Blue Edition is available for Windows and Linux, though Mac is unsupported.

In July 2011, Genuitec released MyEclipse "Bling," which combines the MyEclipse Blue Edition and MyEclipse for Spring product lines into a unified offering.

In January 2015, Genuitec launched the MyEclipse China site (www.myeclipsecn.com) to provide genuine MyEclipse software to large user base in China.

== See also ==
- Eclipse
- Comparison of integrated development environments (IDEs)
