= Zend Studio =

IDE for PHP

- Developer: Zend Technologies
- Stable release: 13.6.1 / 9 July 2017; 8 years ago
- Type: IDE
- License: Proprietary
- Website: www.zend.com/products/zend-studio

Zend Studio is a commercial, proprietary integrated development environment (IDE) for PHP developed by Zend Technologies, based on the PHP Development Tools (PDT) plugin for the Eclipse platform (the PDT project is led by Zend).

Zend Studio is tightly integrated with Zend Server, Zend's pre-integrated, tested PHP application stack. The integration enables developers to quickly set up a complete PHP environment and speed up root cause analysis of problems detected in testing or in the production environment.

Zend Studio is also integrated with Zend Framework (Version 1.x and 2.x.) For example, it provides an MVC view for easy code navigation and integration with Zend_Tool for automated code generation.

Along with Zend Server, in 2013 Zend Studio had been deployed at more than 40,000 companies.

== Features ==
- Code folding
- Customized Framework Project Layout
- Zend Framework Zend_Tool Integration
- Symfony 2 Framework support
- Model–view–controller View
- In-place Refactoring (smart rename)
- Visual Mobile Development support
- Code semantic analysis & quick fix
- PHP 4 and PHP 5.X Support
- Mark occurrences of language elements, exit paths and requires
- Type hierarchy of classes and methods
- Dojo Toolkit support
- jsDoc support
- PHP script debugging (Remote/local servers and Browser via FireFox plugin)
- Auto detection of a local Zend Server
- Servers View
- Zend Server events list
- Import and debug Zend Server events
- Easy project creation on Zend Server
- Quick on-server debug mechanism
- Zend Server API
- Integrated PHPUnit
- Integration with phpDocumentor
- Atlassian connector support via Eclipse plugin (Jira, Bamboo, FishEye, Crucible)
- Git, Subversion, CVS, and Perforce (via Eclipse plugin) support
- Deployment with FTP, SFTP and FTP over SSH
- Database view for MySQL, Microsoft SQL Server, Oracle, PostgreSQL, SQLite and others
- Project/File Browser
- Web services support
- Import Zend Studio 5.5 projects
- Remote Project Support

== See also ==
- Zend Technologies
- Zend Server
- List of Eclipse-based software
- Eclipse
- Xdebug
