= Strikeiron =

StrikeIron
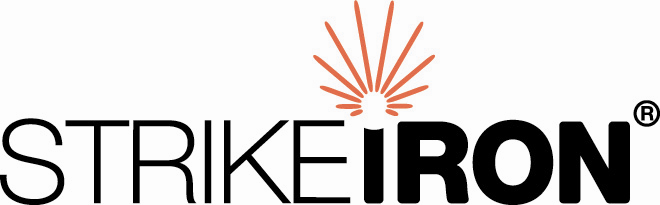
- Company type: Private
- Founded: 2003
- Headquarters: Cary, NC
- Key people: Sean O'Leary; (President, CEO); Bob Brauer; (Co-Founder, CSO)
- Website: www.strikeiron.com

StrikeIron provided a cloud-based Data Quality Suite including email verification, address verification, phone validation, phone append, and sales tax calculation solutions. The company was based in Research Triangle Park, N.C. It was founded by Bob Brauer (founder of DataFlux and Interzoid), Richard Holcomb (co-founder of HAHT Software and Q+E Software), and Robert Dale in 2003. StrikeIron was a leader in Data-as-a-Service with its delivery platform IronCloud.

The company has raised over $16 million USD in venture funding. It was financially backed by Ascent Ventures, The Aurora Funds, and NC IDEA.

StrikeIron was acquired by Informatica in June 2014. Prior to the acquisition, the CEO of the company was Sean O'Leary.

== History ==
The company was based in Research Triangle Park, N.C. It was founded by Bob Brauer.

The early vision of the company was to provide products that would help programmers and business analysts to find Web services (similarly known today as Cloud APIs). During the company's initial launch, StrikeIron offered its first product, the Web Services Analyzer. This software product was developed to provide fast analysis and understanding of web service offerings. The Analyzer located and generated graphically the data requirements, functionality and applicability for web services by analyzing and dynamically invoking them over the Web.

In 2005, StrikeIron rolled out the Web Services Marketplace, the world's largest online marketplace dedicated to commercial Web services. The Web Services Marketplace brought together a community of providers and users to buy and sell Web services subscriptions. StrikeIron also released a desktop-based premium version of the Analyzer that allowed users to easily browse through both internal and external directories. It included direct access to the StrikeIron Web Services Marketplace.

Later in 2005, StrikeIron released more of its own Web services like sales tax and SMS solutions. The product portfolio continued to grow in 2006 with the addition of email verification, zip code information, and financial data services.

In 2012, StrikeIron won the "Cloud Computing Company of the Year" award, along with an award for best cloud infrastructure, at the inaugural Cloud Awards program.

In 2014, StrikeIron was acquired by Informatica
