= Perforce =

American software company

Perforce Software, Inc.
- Type: Private
- Industry: Version control software, application lifecycle management, Git repository management, developer collaboration tools, platform automation tools, and Agile planning software
- Founded: 1995; 31 years ago in Alameda, California, U.S.
- Founder: Christopher Seiwald
- Headquarters: Minneapolis, Minnesota, U.S.
- Area served: Worldwide
- Key people: Christopher Seiwald (Founder); Jim Cassens (CEO); Janet Dryer (Chair)
- Products: Akana; CodeDynamics; Gliffy; Hansoft; Helix ALM suite; Helix Core; Helix QAC; Helix Swarm; Helix TeamHub; HostAccess; HydraExpress; IMSL Numerical Libraries; JRebel and Xrebel; Klocwork; OpenLogic; Perfecto; Puppet; PV-WAVE; SourcePro; Stingray; TestCraft; TotalView for HPC; Visualization; Zend Server; Zend Studio
- Owner: Clearlake Capital; Francisco Partners
- Number of employees: 1,800 approx (2025)
- Website: perforce.com

Perforce Software, Inc. is an American developer of software used for developing and running applications, including version control software, web-based repository management, developer collaboration, application lifecycle management, web application servers, debugging tools, platform automation, and agile planning software.

The company is based in Minneapolis, Minnesota, and is equally owned by private equity firms Clearlake Capital and Francisco Partners.

== History ==
Perforce was founded in 1995 in Alameda, California by Christopher Seiwald, a software developer and computer science graduate from UC Berkeley. Its first product was also called Perforce, and was a version control system allowing companies to collaborate on large software projects by keeping track of changes to both the source code and binary files.

In June 2013, the company released P4 Code Review (formerly Helix Swarm), a tool for developers working in different geographic areas to collaborate on code review.

In June 2014, the company released a version of its Perforce versioning engine, then known as P4D, which supported concurrency.

In March 2015, the company renamed its product to Perforce Helix, which now supported distributed development and included security features allowing suspicious usage tracking. Helix's security capabilities included IP threat detection, co-developed with analytics vendor Interset. In October, the company collaborated with GitLab to release GitSwarm, a software tool that combined git distributed workflow for developers with Perforce's single code repository.

In February 2016, Seiwald sold the company to investment group Summit Partners, and Janet Dryer was named as new CEO. The company headquarters was relocated to Minneapolis. In November, Perforce announced the acquisition of Seapine Software, a provider of application lifecycle management (ALM) tools. Seapine's TestTrack ALM software was rebranded as Helix ALM and eventually Perforce ALM.

In September 2017, the company acquired Uppsala, Sweden-based Hansoft, a developer of Agile planning software. Also in September, Perforce announced it had acquired Finnish repository management services company Deveo. Deveo's products were merged into Perforce TeamHub, its first solo venture for Git-based development teams.

In January 2018, Summit Partners sold Perforce to private equity firm Clearlake Capital. In May, Perforce acquired UK-based Programming Research (PRQA), a static code analysis firm. In June, the company announced that CEO Janet Dryer was moving to the role of Chair of the Board, and COO/CFO Mark Ties was taking the role of CEO. In October, the company acquired mobile and web automation testing company Perfecto.

In January 2019, Perforce announced the acquisition of Rogue Wave Software, a software company with a focus on development tools for high-performance computing. In April, private equity firm Francisco Partners acquired 50% of Perforce, becoming an equal partner with Clearlake Capital. In September, Perforce Software was awarded the 2019 Computer Entertainment Developers Conference (CEDEC) Award for Engineering for P4 (formerly Helix Core).

In June 2020, Perforce acquired software developer TestCraft Technologies, a provider of automated Selenium-based web application testing. In July, Perforce acquired software developer Methodics, a DevOps software provider of intellectual property life cycle management for semiconductor companies.

In October 2021, Perforce agreed to buy BlazeMeter testing platform from Broadcom Inc for an undisclosed sum.

In April 2022, Perforce acquired the Portland, Oregon-based infrastructure automation software platform, Puppet.

In March 2024, Perforce acquired the Redwood City, California-based test data management software, Delphix.

== Products ==
Perforce develops software used by software developers to manage code during the development process. The product line includes the following:

=== P4 ===
P4 (Helix Core)
- Release: 1995; 31 years ago
- Stable release: 2024.2/2697822 / October 31, 2024; 2 years ago
- Operating system: AIX, FreeBSD, HP-UX, Linux, macOS, NetBSD, Solaris, Windows
- Type: Revision control
- License: Proprietary
- Website: www.perforce.com/products/helix-core

Perforce P4 (formerly Helix Core) is the company's version control software for large scale development environments. The P4 Version Control System manages a central database and a master repository of file versions.

P4 clients fall into roughly five categories: Git, command, GUI, web, and plugin. The Perforce system can make part or all of its content available as Git repositories. Users of Git and of other clients can work with the same file content and history. Git commits are visible to users of other clients as Perforce changelists, and vice versa. Users submit changed files together in changelists, which are applied as atomic commits.

The server and client software are released as pre-built executables for Microsoft Windows, macOS, Linux, Solaris, FreeBSD, and other operating systems.

=== Perforce ALM ===
Helix ALM
- Release: March 1996; 30 years ago
- Stable release: 2022.1.0 / May 9, 2022; 4 years ago
- Operating system: Microsoft Windows, Linux, Mac OS X
- Type: Bug tracking system, project management software
- License: Proprietary
- Website: www.perforce.com/products/helix-alm

Perforce ALM (formerly Helix ALM) is a suite of tools used for application lifecycle management (ALM), allowing developers to manage all their product and system development phases with one product. The software was originally developed by Seapine Software, which was acquired by Perforce and rebranded. Perforce ALM provides a centralized suite of capabilities for managing requirements, defects, issues and testing throughout the software development cycle.

There are three components of the suite:

- Requirements management
- Issue tracking and management
- Test case management

=== Perforce QAC ===
The company develops the Perforce QAC static code analysis software tool for the C and C++ programming languages.

=== Other products and services ===
- Perforce TeamHub is a code and artifact hosting and developer collaboration tool that supports development in Git environments, in addition to Apache Subversion and Mercurial.
- P4 Code Review is a development tool integrated with P4, that allows geographically dispersed developers to coordinate their code review.
- Hansoft is software used to support agile software development.
- Perfecto is a testing platform for desktop and mobile apps.
- TestCraft is an automated Selenium-based web application testing platform.

With the January 2019 Rogue Wave acquisition, Perforce acquired the following products:

- Akana – a provider of computer software products for application programming interface (API) management
- CodeDynamics – a software tool for dynamic code analysis
- Gliffy – software for diagramming via an HTML5 cloud-based app
- HostAccess – a suite of terminal emulation products for Windows
- HydraExpress – a framework for creating C++ Web services from existing C++ code
- IMSL Numerical Libraries – a commercial collection of software libraries of numerical analysis functionality for computer programming
- PV-WAVE – an array oriented fourth-generation programming language used to build and deploy visual data analysis applications
- JRebel and XRebel – Java development and performance management tools for software developers
- Klocwork – a static code analysis tool
- SourcePro – software that enables developers to build C++ apps using common APIs that can be migrated from one platform to another
- Stingray – a tool for developing object oriented front ends for Windows programming
- TotalView for HPC – Debugging software for C/C++, Fortran, and Mixed-Language Python Applications
- Visualization – data visualization tools to assist with application development, including a GUI builder and data management abstraction capabilities
- Zend Server – a web application server for running and managing PHP applications
- Zend Studio – a commercial, proprietary integrated development environment (IDE) for PHP

In addition, Perforce also acquired OpenLogic, a consulting organization with expertise in open source software from Rogue Wave.

== Offices ==
The company is headquartered in Minneapolis, Minnesota, with additional offices worldwide.
