= Project Harmony (licensing) =

Project Harmony is an initiative by Canonical Ltd. about contributor agreements for Open Source software. The aim of the Harmony project is to develop templates of Contributor License Agreements for use by Free and open source software (FOSS) projects.

The Canonical initiative was announced in June 2010 by Amanda Brock, General Counsel at Canonical. In July 2011, the project released version 1.0 of its agreements templates. Following this release, the project was seen by some as an important step for intellectual property and copyright management for open Source software, and by some others as "Making an exception (ie copyright aggregation) the norm".

== Contributor agreement options ==
The project proposes two types of options for the Contributor License Agreements:

- Copyright License: The contributors retain the copyright to their contribution.
- Copyright Assignment: The contributors transfer the copyright of their contribution to the project.

== See also ==
- Free and open source software (FOSS)
- Contributor License Agreement
- Harmony CLA
