= Nirvanix =

Nirvanix, Inc.
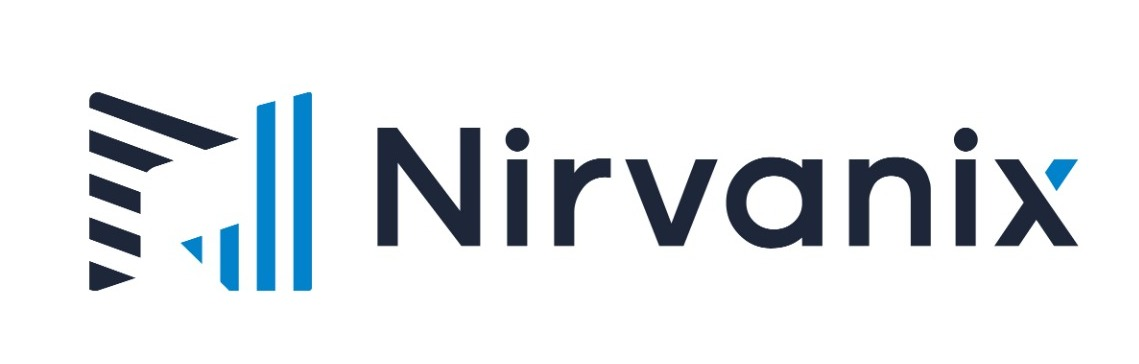
- Type: Private
- Industry: Information management
- Founded: 2007
- Headquarters: San Diego, California, U.S.
- Services: Business Phone Systems
- Website: techcrunch.com/2013/09/27/its-official-the-nirvanix-cloud-storage-service-is-shutting-down/

Nirvanix is an American-based provider of business phone systems, VoIP services, hosted PBX, SIP Trunks, and cloud storage services headquartered in San Diego, California, United States. The company offers a variety of business phone solutions for small, medium as well as enterprise businesses. It also has a strong presence in public, hybrid and private cloud storage services with usage-based pricing. Based on previous service companies founded in 1998, Nirvanix shut down in October 2013. In July 2021 Nirvanix re-entered the business with $12 million funding.

== History ==
Streamload, founded in 1998 in San Diego, California, by Steve Iverson, a student at Pomona College, was one of the first Internet storage services, receiving various accolades for products between 2002 and 2006. The company attracted angel investor and computer software entrepreneur Charlie Jackson and $1.2 million in investment by August 2004.

Streamload's flagship product was renamed to MediaMax and spun off on July 1, 2007, with the existing company being renamed to Nirvanix. The failure of MediaMax (renamed to The Linkup) on August 8, 2008, resulted in permanent loss of data for around 20,000 paying customers; Nirvanix denied responsibility for the data loss, saying that Savvis was contracted by its The Linkup spin-off to host the application and the database.

Patrick Harr and Geoff Tudor wanted to pursue the storage service market for enterprise customers. A new Nirvanix system, called the Storage Delivery Network, was built with new software and hardware systems. Nirvanix incorporated both the lessons-learned operating a large-scale online storage service under Streamload as well as techniques in clustering, virtualization, database-driven file system architectures and distributed networking. Nirvanix filed nine patents on this new platform in August 2007. It announced its Nirvanix Storage Delivery Network in September 2007, comparing it to the Amazon Simple Storage Service.

The company raised $12 million in September 2007 from Mission Ventures Valhalla Partners and Windward Ventures. Intel Capital added $5 million in funding in December 2007 (along with original investors and European Founders Fund), and then more funding in April 2009. An additional round was announced in November 2010. On May 3, 2012, Nirvanix announced it raised over $25 million in a Series C funding round led by Khosla Ventures, bringing Nirvanix's total capital raised to $70 million.

On July 12, 2021, Nirvanix announced that it had closed a $12 million equity financing round led by Mission Ventures and Valhalla Partners with participation from Windward Ventures.

Nirvanix provided public, hybrid, and private cloud storage service options. The underlying technology included:

- Cloud File System, a virtual file system specifically designed to handle millions of users and billions of files in a single global namespace with data consistency.
- Cloud Storage Network which consists of nine globally dispersed data centers. Customers can locate data close to users and to choose redundancy levels by replicating data to two, three, or more data centers.
- Cloud NAS Gateway software which installs on Windows or Linux servers and provides access to the Nirvanix cloud storage services.

Storage was accessible via HTTP, using the Nirvanix Web Services application programming interface based on Representational State Transfer (REST) and Simple Object Access Protocol (SOAP) or the Nirvanix CloudNAS gateway software.

Scott Genereux was appointed president and CEO of Nirvanix in November 2010, replacing Jim Zierick. Since then the company overhauled its management team and signed a number of partners, including a 5-year OEM agreement with IBM. Nirvanix has also deployed petabyte-scale clouds at Cerner, USC, and others. In December 2012 Genereux left to join Oracle Corporation, and was replaced by Dru Borden, who was then replaced by Debra Chrapaty in March 2013.

Despite the earlier agreement, IBM acquired SoftLayer in June 2013 and started a competitor IBM Cloud Services Division.

== Closure ==
On September 16, 2013 Nirvanix notified customers that they had until September 30, 2013 to move their data off of the service at which point Nirvanix would shut down. By September 28, 2013, the company deactivated its website and replaced it with a statement that included customer support details. Nirvanix said an IBM team could assist customers with transferring their data from the Nirvanix infrastructure. The company filed for US Chapter 11 bankruptcy on October 1, 2013, which was approved on October 8.

On December 4, 2013, Oracle issued an announcement that they had acquired select intellectual property of Nirvanix, as well as key engineering resources.

== Current Company Focus ==
Nirvanix is currently focusing on innovation around VoIP Phone Systems, hosted PBX, cloud storage and other similar functions.
