= IMSL Numerical Libraries =

Collection of software libraries

- Developer: Perforce
- Written in: C, Fortran, Java, Python
- Type: Numerical analysis software
- Website: www.perforce.com

The International Mathematics and Statistics Library (IMSL) is a commercial collection of software libraries that provide a wide range of numerical analysis functions. These libraries are implemented in programming languages such as C, Java, C#.NET, and Fortran. Additionally, a Python interface is available, making the library accessible to a broader range of developers and data scientists.

== Version history ==
The first IMSL Library for the Fortran language was released in 1970, followed by a C-language version originally called C/Base in 1991, a Java-language version in 2002, and the C#-language version in 2004.

Several recent product releases have involved making IMSL Library functions available from Python. These releases are Python wrappers to IMSL C Library functions (PyIMSL wrappers) and PyIMSL Studio, a prototyping and production application development environment based on Python and the IMSL C Library. The PyIMSL wrappers were first released in August 2008. PyIMSL Studio was introduced in February 2009. PyIMSL Studio is available for download at no charge for non-commercial use or for commercial evaluation.

Current versions:

- IMSL C Library V 8.0 – November 2011
- IMSL C# Library V 6.5.2 – November 2015 (end of life announced as end of 2020)
- IMSL Fortran Library V 7.0 – October 2010
- PyIMSL Studio V 1.5 – August 2009
- PyIMSL wrappers V 1.5 – August 2009
- JMSL Library V 6.1 – August 2010

== Platform availability ==
The IMSL Numerical Libraries are supported on various operating systems, hardware, and compilers.

- Operating system support includes Unix, Linux, Mac OS and Microsoft Windows
- Hardware support includes AMD, Intel, Apple Inc., Cray, Fujitsu, Hitachi, HP, IBM, NEC, SGI and Sun Microsystems
- Compiler support includes Absoft, GCC, Intel, Microsoft, and Portland

== See also ==
- List of numerical-analysis software
- List of numerical libraries
