= Rogue Wave Software =

American software company

Rogue Wave Software, Inc.
- Type: Subsidiary
- Founded: 1989; 37 years ago, Seattle, Washington
- Headquarters: Louisville, Colorado
- Key people: Mark Ties, CEO
- Products: Software
- Parent: Perforce
- Website: www.perforce.com

Rogue Wave Software was an American software development company based in Louisville, Colorado. It provided cross-platform software development tools and embedded components for parallel, data-intensive, and other high-performance computing (HPC) applications.

In January 2019, the firm was acquired by Minneapolis, Minnesota–based application software developer Perforce, which is maintaining Rogue Wave's products.

== History ==
The company was founded in 1989 in Seattle, Washington by Thomas Keffer and Richard Romea, producing a C++ class library in 1989 called Math.h++. In 1990, the company moved to Corvallis, Oregon, and released Tools.h++, which predated the Standard Template Library. In November 1996, they had an initial public offering, listing their shares on the NASDAQ under symbol RWAV. In January 1998, Rogue Wave Software announced they were buying Morrisville, North Carolina–based Stingray Software, a developer of object oriented tools for Windows programmers.

In 2001, the ".h++" products were combined into the product family SourcePro C++. In 2003, the company was acquired by Quovadx, which was in turn acquired by private equity firm Battery Ventures in July 2007.

Rogue Wave Software then became an independent company again. In May 2009, the company acquired Visual Numerics, developer of IMSL Numerical Libraries and PV-WAVE data analytics software, and TotalView Technologies, Inc (formerly Etnus, Inc.), which provides debugging tools for C, C++ and Fortran (TotalView, MemoryScape and ReplayEngine).

In 2010, the company acquired Acumem, a multicore performance software company and developer of Threadspotter performance optimization software. In May 2012, they acquired IBM's ILOG C++ visualization products, followed by their Java and Flex visualization products in September 2014.

In August 2013, the company acquired open source software consulting firm OpenLogic, and static code analysis software Klocwork in January 2014. With expanding business scope and need for new hires, in October 2015, Rogue Wave moved from Boulder to a somewhat larger and newer space in Louisville, closer to the Denver talent pool; it also acquired Zend Technologies, a maker of PHP tools and services. In November 2016, Rogue Wave Software announced the acquisition of Akana, a leading API management software vendor. In November 2017, the company acquired ZeroTurnaround, creator of JRebel and XRebel Java developer tools for profiling and deployment.

In January 2019, the company was acquired by Minneapolis-based application software developer Perforce. In addition, Perforce also acquired OpenLogic, a consulting organization with expertise in open source software, from Rogue Wave.

== Products and services ==
Rogue Wave products acquired by Perforce included the following:

- Akana - computer software products for application programming interface (API) management
- CodeDynamics - a software tool for dynamic code analysis
- HostAccess - a suite of terminal emulation products for Windows
- HydraExpress - a framework for creating C++ Web services from existing C++ code
- IMSL Numerical Libraries - a commercial collection of software libraries of numerical analysis functionality for computer programming
- PV-WAVE - an array oriented fourth-generation programming language used to build and deploy visual data analysis applications
- JRebel and XRebel - Java development and performance management tools for software developers
- Klocwork - a static code analysis tool
- SourcePro - software that enables developers to build C++ apps using common APIs that can be migrated from one platform to another
- Stingray - a tool for developing object oriented front ends for Windows programming
- TotalView for HPC - Debugging software for C/C++, Fortran, and Mixed-Language Python Applications
- Visualization - data visualization tools to assist with application development, including a GUI builder and data management abstraction capabilities
- Zend Server - a web application server for running and managing PHP applications
- Zend Studio - a commercial, proprietary integrated development environment (IDE) for PHP
