= PHP Development Tools =

Eclipse IDE plugin

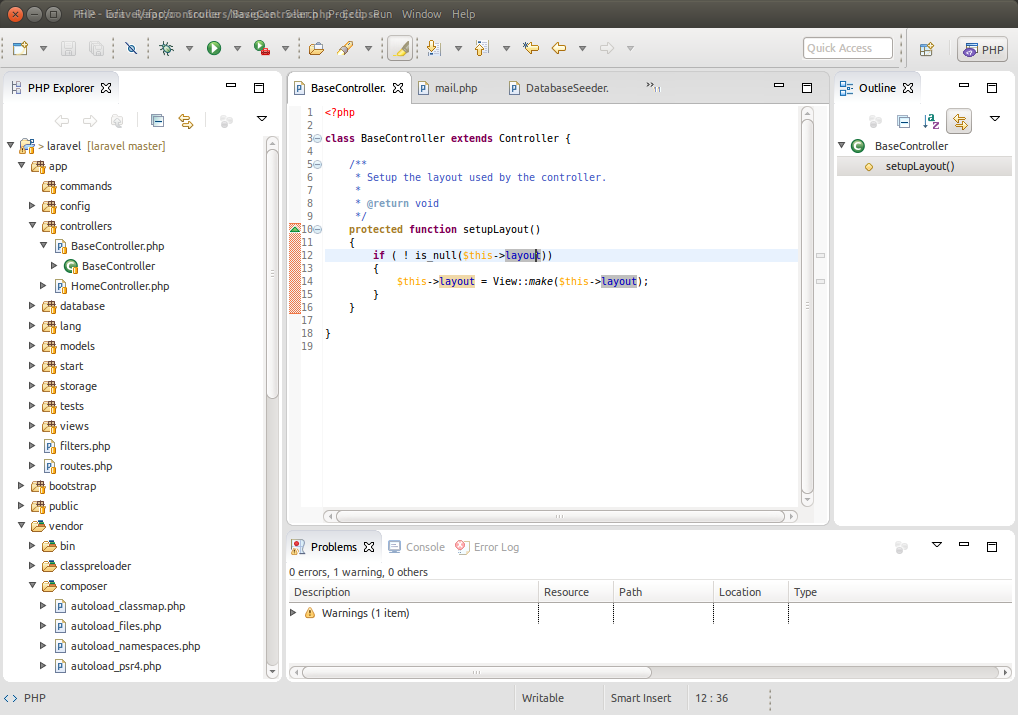
- Developer: Eclipse Foundation
- Stable release: 8.2 / December 2, 2023; 2 years ago
- Operating system: Cross-platform
- Type: PHP IDE
- License: Eclipse Public License
- Website: eclipse.dev/pdt/
- Repository: https://github.com/eclipse/pdt

PHP Development Tools (PDT) is a language IDE plugin for the Eclipse platform and the open-source project that develops it.

The project intends to encompass all tools necessary to develop PHP based software. It uses the existing Eclipse Web Tools Project to provide developers with PHP capabilities. All these PHP tools are easy to use and developers can speed up the development process by using these tools. Additional plugins are available as PDT Extensions.

== Key features ==
=== PHP editor ===
- Syntax Highlighting
- Content Assist
- Code Formatter
- Refactoring
- Code Templates

=== Debugging and profiling ===
- Zend Debugger
- Xdebug

== Primary modules ==
- Core — parser, search algorithm, communication and more
- Debug — protocols, messages, executable and web server
- User Interface — editor, views, preferences and wizards
- Formatter — advanced code formatter
- Refactoring — PHP refactoring support
- PHPUnit — PHPUnit Support
- Composer — Composer Support
- Profiler — Xdebug and Zend Debugger profiling support

== Project timeline ==
The project officially began around March 8, 2006. By the end of 2006, the project was approaching the 0.7 release. On April 6, 2007, 0.7 RC3 was released as the final 0.7 version.

In the latter half of 2007, a series of 1.0 milestones were reached, and on September 18, 2007, PDT 1.0 Final was released.

== Naming issues ==
The PHP Development Tools project has had two names during its development. It was initially named PHP Development Tools, then changed to PHP IDE, and reverted to PHP Development Tools on January 1, 2007. Various documentation and reviews use either name.

== Zend Technologies contributions ==
Significant PDT development is being done by Zend Technologies. Zend sells a competing product named Zend Studio. PDT, as free software, may cannibalize sales of Zend Studio although the latter has more features. Others contend that PDT is deliberately maintained as a "lite" version of Zend Studio.
