= Eclipse (software) =

Software development environment

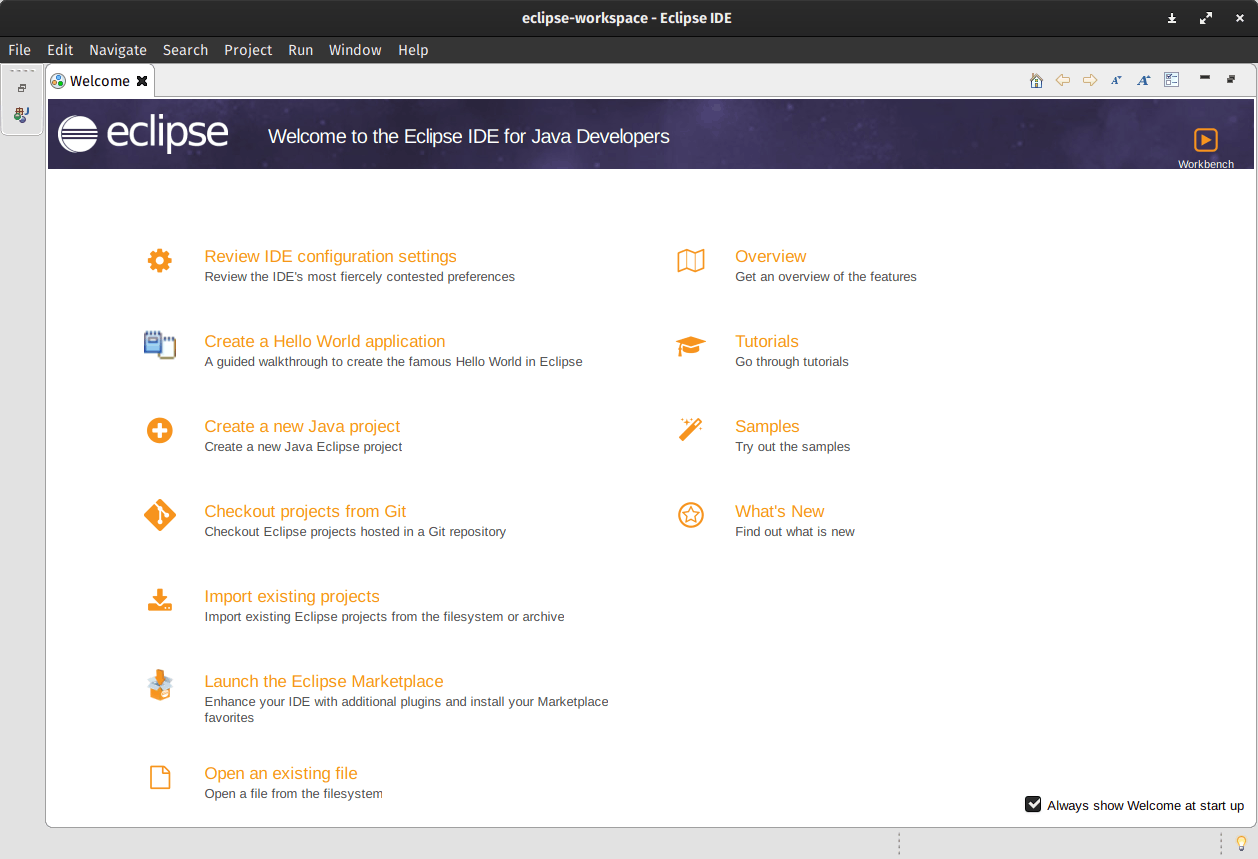
- Welcome screen of Eclipse 4.12
- Original author: IBM
- Developer: Eclipse Foundation
- Release: 1.0 / 29 November 2001; 24 years ago
- Stable release: 4.41.0 / 9 September 2026 (49 days ago)
- Written in: Java, C
- Operating system: Linux, macOS, Windows
- Platform: Java SE, Standard Widget Toolkit, x86-64, AArch64
- Available in: 44 languages
- List of languages Albanian, Arabic, Basque, Bulgarian, Catalan, Chinese (simplified, traditional), Czech, Danish, Dutch, English (Australia, Canada), Estonian, Finnish, French, German, Greek, Hebrew, Hindi, Hungarian, Indonesian, Italian, Japanese, Klingon, Korean, Kurdish, Lithuanian, Malayalam, Mongolian, Myanmar, Nepali, Norwegian, Persian, Polish, Portuguese (Portugal, Brazil), Romanian, Russian, Serbian, Slovak, Slovenian, Spanish, Swedish, Thai, Turkish, Ukrainian, Vietnamese
- Type: Programming tool, integrated development environment (IDE)
- License: Eclipse Public License
- Website: eclipseide.org
- Repository: https://github.com/eclipse-platform/eclipse.platform

Eclipse is an integrated development environment (IDE) used in computer programming. It contains a base workspace and an extensible plug-in system for customizing the environment. It had been the most popular IDE for Java development until 2016, when it was surpassed by IntelliJ IDEA. Eclipse is written mostly in Java and its primary use is for developing Java applications, but it may also be used to develop applications in other programming languages via plug-ins, including Ada, ABAP, C, C++, C#, Clojure, COBOL, D, Erlang, Fortran, Groovy, Haskell, HLASM, (Note: Via IBM Developer for z/OS (IDz), formerly known as Rational Developer for z Systems (RDz), and optionally IBM Open Editor for Z.) JavaScript, Julia, Lasso, Lua, NATURAL, Perl, PHP, PL/I, Prolog, Python, R, Rexx, Ruby (including the Ruby on Rails framework), Rust, Scala, and Scheme. It can also be used to develop documents with LaTeX (via a TeXlipse plug-in) and packages for the software Mathematica. Development environments include the Eclipse Java development tools (JDT) for Java and Scala, Eclipse CDT for C/C++, and Eclipse PDT for PHP, among others.

The initial codebase originated from IBM VisualAge. The Eclipse software development kit (SDK), which includes the Java development tools, is meant for Java developers. Users can extend its abilities by installing plug-ins written for the Eclipse Platform, such as development toolkits for other programming languages, and can write and contribute their own plug-ins. Since Eclipse 3.0 (released in 2004), plug-ins are installed and managed as "bundles" using Equinox, an implementation of OSGi.

The Eclipse SDK is free and open-source software, released under the terms of the Eclipse Public License, although it is incompatible with the GNU General Public License. It was one of the first IDEs to run under GNU Classpath and it runs without problems under IcedTea.

== History ==
Eclipse was inspired by the Smalltalk-based VisualAge family of integrated development environment (IDE) products. Although fairly successful, a major drawback of the VisualAge products was that developed code was not in a component-based software engineering model. Instead, all code for a project was held in a compressed database using SCID techniques (somewhat like a zip file but in .dat). Individual classes could not be easily accessed, certainly not outside the tool. A team primarily at the IBM Cary, North Carolina, lab developed the new product as a Java-based replacement. In November 2001, a consortium was formed with a board of stewards to further the development of Eclipse as open-source software. It is estimated that IBM had already invested nearly $40 million by that time. The original members were Borland, IBM, Merant, QNX Software Systems, Rational Software, Red Hat, SuSE, TogetherSoft, and WebGain. The number of stewards increased to over 80 by the end of 2003. In January 2004, the Eclipse Foundation was created.

Eclipse 3.0 (released on 21 June 2004) selected the OSGi Service Platform specifications as the runtime architecture.

The Association for Computing Machinery recognized Eclipse with the 2011 ACM Software System Award on 26 April 2012.

Recent releases of the Eclipse IDE have introduced support for the latest programming language standards, such as Java 23 and C++23, as well as usability enhancements including a refreshed light theme, improved code folding for Java, and updated C/C++ tooling based on the Clang compiler frontend.

=== Licensing ===
The Eclipse Public License (EPL) is the fundamental license under which Eclipse projects are released. Some projects require dual licensing, for which the Eclipse Distribution License (EDL) is available, although use of this license must be applied for and is considered on a case-by-case basis.

Eclipse was originally released under the Common Public License, but was later re-licensed under the Eclipse Public License. The Free Software Foundation has said that both licenses are free software licenses, but are incompatible with the GNU General Public License (GPL).

=== Name ===
According to Lee Nackman, Chief Technology Officer of IBM's Rational division (originating in 2003) at that time, the name "Eclipse" (dating from at least 2001) was not a wordplay on Sun Microsystems, as the product's primary competition at the time of naming was Microsoft Visual Studio, which Eclipse was to eclipse.

Different versions of Eclipse have been given different science-related names. The versions named after Callisto, Europa, and Ganymede, which are moons of Jupiter, were followed by a version named after Galileo, the discoverer of those moons. These were followed by two sun-themed names, Helios of Greek mythology, and Indigo, one of the seven colors of a rainbow (which is produced by the sun). The version after that, Juno, has a triple meaning: a Roman mythological figure, an asteroid, and a spacecraft to Jupiter. Kepler, Luna, and Mars continued the astronomy theme, and then Neon and Oxygen constituted a theme of chemical elements. Photon represented a return to sun-themed names.

As of 2018, the alphabetic scheme was abandoned in order to better align with the new Simultaneous Release strategy. Releases are named in the format YYYY-MM to reflect the quarterly releases, starting with version 4.9 named 2018-09.

=== Releases ===
Since 2006, the Foundation has coordinated an annual Simultaneous Release. Each release includes the Eclipse Platform and several other Eclipse projects.

From 2008 through 2018, each Simultaneous Release had occurred on the 4th Wednesday of June. In 2018 the project switched to quarterly (13 week) YYYY-MM releases without intermediate service releases.

Version name	Date	Platform version	Projects	Main changes
N/A	29 November 2001	1.0		A 1.3 level Java runtime or Java development kit must be installed on the machine in order to run this version of Eclipse.
N/A	18 September 2002	2.0		
N/A	15 April 2003	2.1		A 1.4 level Java runtime or Java development kit (JDK) can also be used to run Eclipse. It is still possible to use a 1.3 level Java runtime or Java development kit (JDK).
N/A	21 June 2004	3.0		A 1.4.1 level Java runtime or Java development kit must be installed on the machine in order to run this version of Eclipse.
N/A	28 June 2005	3.1		Added Java 5 support: generics, annotations, boxing-unboxing, enums, enhanced for loop, varargs, static imports
Callisto	26 June 2006	3.2	Callisto projects	
Europa	27 June 2007	3.3	Europa projects	
Ganymede	25 June 2008	3.4	Ganymede projects	
Galileo	24 June 2009	3.5	Galileo projects	
Helios	23 June 2010	3.6	Helios projects	
Indigo	22 June 2011	3.7	Indigo projects	Added Java 7 support (3.7.1 sr1): Improved Type Inference for Generic Instance Creation (Diamond), Multi-catch, try-with-resources statement, Simplified Varargs Method Invocation, Strings in switch, Binary Literals and Underscores in Numeric Literals, Polymorphic Methods
Juno	27 June 2012	3.8 and 4.2 (Note: There is a 3.8 release of Eclipse Juno; it is not promoted on the main downloads page, but a packaged distribution is available for download. Eclipse 3.8 provides bugfixes for Indigo & adds Java 7 support, and its maintenance was dual streamed with 4.2. Features and plug-ins equivalent to a packaged distribution may be added from within the IDE.)	Juno projects	
Kepler	26 June 2013	4.3	Kepler projects	A Java 6 JRE/JDK is recommended to run this version.
Luna	25 June 2014	4.4	Luna projects	Integrated Java 8 support; in the prior version, this was possible via a Java 8 patch plug-in. A Java 7 JRE/JDK is required to run most of the packages based on this version.
Mars	24 June 2015	4.5	Mars projects	A Java 7 JRE/JDK is required to run all packages based on this version.
Neon	22 June 2016	4.6	Neon projects	A Java 8 JRE/JDK is required to run all packages based on this version.
Oxygen	28 June 2017	4.7	Oxygen projects	Oxygen.1a introduced Java 9 and Junit 5 support and Oxygen.3a introduced Java 10 support. Dropped support for the following Unix based platforms: AIX, Solaris, HP-UX and s390. From this version on, a Java 8 or newer JRE/JDK is required to run Eclipse.
Photon	27 June 2018	4.8	Photon projects	Dropped support for 32bit Windows and Linux.
2018-09	19 September 2018	4.9	2018-09 projects	
2018-12	19 December 2018	4.10	2018-12 projects	Added support for Java 11.
2019-03	20 March 2019	4.11	2019-03 projects	
2019-06	19 June 2019	4.12	2019-06 projects	
2019-09	18 September 2019	4.13	2019-09 projects	
2019-12	18 December 2019	4.14	2019-12 projects	
2020-03	18 March 2020	4.15	2020-03 projects	Update support for Web Development languages, relying on Language Server Protocol
2020-06	17 June 2020	4.16	2020-06 projects	
2020-09	16 September 2020	4.17	2020-09 projects	From this version on, a Java 11 or newer JRE/JDK is required to run Eclipse.
2020-12	16 December 2020	4.18	2020-12 projects	A JDK is embedded into most packages, so a Java installation is not a prerequisite anymore.
2021-03	17 March 2021	4.19	2021-03 projects	
2021-06	16 June 2021	4.20	2021-06 projects	
2021-09	15 September 2021	4.21	2021-09 projects	
2021-12	8 December 2021	4.22	2021-12 projects	
2022-03	16 March 2022	4.23	2022-03 projects	
2022-06	15 June 2022	4.24	2022-06 projects	
2022-09	14 September 2022	4.25	2022-09 projects	From this version on, a Java 17 or newer JRE/JDK is required to run Eclipse.
2022-12	7 December 2022	4.26	2022-12 projects	
2023-03	15 March 2023	4.27	2023-03 projects	
2023-06	14 June 2023	4.28	2023-06 projects	
2023-09	13 September 2023	4.29	2023-09 projects	
2023-12	6 December 2023	4.30	2023-12 projects	
2024-03	13 March 2024	4.31	2024-03 projects	
2024-06	12 June 2024	4.32	2024-06 projects	From this version on, a Java 21 or newer JRE/JDK is required to run Eclipse.
2024-09	11 September 2024	4.33	2024-09 projects	
2024-12	4 December 2024	4.34	2024-12 projects	
2025-03	12 March 2025	4.35	2025-03 projects	
2025-06	11 June 2025	4.36	2025-06 projects	
2025-09	10 September 2025	4.37	2025-09 projects	
2025-12	10 December 2025	4.38	2025-12 projects	
2026-03	11 March 2026	4.39	2026-03 projects	
2026-06	10 June 2026	4.40	2026-06 projects	
2026-09	9 September 2026	4.41	2026-09 projects	
2026-12	9 December 2026	4.42	2026-12 projects	

Unsupported
Supported
Latest version
Future version

== Architecture ==
Eclipse uses plug-ins to provide all the functionality within and on top of the run-time system. Its run-time system is based on Equinox, an implementation of the OSGi core framework specification.

In addition to allowing the Eclipse Platform to be extended using other programming languages, such as C and Python, the plug-in framework allows the Eclipse Platform to work with typesetting languages like LaTeX and networking applications such as telnet and database management systems. The plug-in architecture supports writing any desired extension to the environment, such as for configuration management. Java and CVS support is provided in the Eclipse SDK, with support for other version control systems provided by third-party plug-ins.

With the exception of a small run-time kernel, everything in Eclipse is a plug-in. Thus, every plug-in developed integrates with Eclipse in the same way as other plug-ins; in this respect, all features are "created equal". Eclipse provides plug-ins for a wide variety of features, some of which are from third parties using both free and commercial models. Examples of plug-ins include for Unified Modeling Language (UML), for Sequence and other UML diagrams, a plug-in for DB Explorer, and many more.

The Eclipse SDK includes the Eclipse Java development tools (JDT), offering an IDE with a built-in Java incremental compiler and a full model of the Java source files. This allows for advanced refactoring techniques and code analysis. The IDE also makes use of a workspace, in this case a set of metadata over a flat filespace allowing external file modifications as long as the corresponding workspace resource is refreshed afterward.

Eclipse implements the graphical control elements of the Java toolkit called Standard Widget Toolkit (SWT), whereas most Java applications use the Java standard Abstract Window Toolkit (AWT), Swing, or JavaFX. Eclipse's user interface also uses an intermediate graphical user interface layer called JFace, which simplifies the construction of applications based on SWT. Eclipse was made to run on Wayland during a Google Summer of Code (GSoC) Project in 2014.

As of 2017, language packs being developed by the Babel Project provide translations into over 40 natural languages.

== Rich client platform ==
Eclipse provides the rich client platform (RCP) for developing general-purpose applications.

The following components constitute the rich client platform:

- Equinox OSGi – a standard bundling framework
- Core platform – boot Eclipse, run plug-ins
- Standard Widget Toolkit (SWT) – a portable widget toolkit
- JFace – viewer classes to bring model view controller programming to SWT, file buffers, text handling, text editors
- Eclipse Workbench – views, editors, perspectives, wizards

Examples of rich client applications based on Eclipse are:

- IBM Notes 8 and 9
- Attachmate-Novell NetIQ Designer for Identity Manager
- Apache Directory Studio
- Remote Component Environment
- DBeaver, a SQL client software
- Portfolio Performance
- UDig, a GIS software
- AnyLogic, a multimethod simulation modeling tool

== Server platform ==
Eclipse supports development for Tomcat, GlassFish and many other servers and is often capable of installing the required server (for development) directly from the IDE. It supports remote debugging, allowing a user to watch variables and step through the code of an application that is running on the attached server.

== Web Tools Platform ==
The Eclipse Web Tools Platform (WTP) project is an extension of the Eclipse platform with tools for developing Web and Java EE applications. It includes source and graphical editors for a variety of languages, wizards and built-in applications to simplify development, and tools and APIs to support deploying, running, and testing apps.

== Modeling platform ==
The Modeling project contains all the official projects of the Eclipse Foundation focusing on model-based development technologies. All are compatible with the Eclipse Modeling Framework created by IBM. Those projects are separated into six categories:

- Model Transformation includes projects using Eclipse Modeling Framework (EMF)-based models as an input to produce either a model or text as an output. Model-to-model transformation projects include ATLAS Transformation Language (ATL), an open source transformation language and toolkit used to transform a given model or to generate a new model from a given EMF model. Model-to-text transformation projects contain Acceleo, an implementation of MOFM2T, a standard model to text language from the Object Management Group (OMG). The Acceleo code generator can generate any textual language (Java, PHP, Python, etc.) from EMF-based models defined with any metamodel (Unified Modeling Language (UML), Systems Modeling Language (SysML), etc.). It is open-source.
- Model Development Tools include projects implementing various modeling standards used in the industry, and their toolkits. Among those projects can be found implementations of several standards:
  - Unified Modeling Language (UML)
  - Systems modeling language (SysML)
  - Object Constraint Language (OCL)
  - Business Process Model and Notation (BPMN)
  - Semantics of Business Vocabulary and Business Rules (SBVR)
  - XML Schema (XSD)
  - National Electronic Distributors Association (NEDA)
  - Model-to-Model Transformations (MMT)
- Concrete Syntax Development contains the Graphical Modeling Framework, an Eclipse-based framework dedicated to the graphical representation of EMF-based models.
- Abstract Syntax Development hosts the Eclipse Modeling Framework, core of most modeling projects of the Eclipse Foundation and frameworks available for the EMF like Connected Data Objects (CDO), EMF query or EMF validation.
- Technology and Research includes modeling project prototypes, hosting all Eclipse Foundation modeling projects during their incubation phase.
- Amalgam provides the packaging and integration between all available modeling tools for the Eclipse package dedicated to modeling tools.

== Application lifecycle management ==
Application lifecycle management (ALM) and task management in Eclipse need an optional component called Mylyn (/ˈmaɪlɪn/), an open-source implementation of the task-focused interface. It provides an API for tools embedding the task-focused interface. For software developers, it helps a developer work efficiently with many different tasks (such as bugs, problem reports or new features). Tasks are integrated into Mylyn. For all tasks that have been integrated, Mylyn monitors user activity and tries to identify information relevant to the task at hand. It uses this task context to focus the Eclipse UI on the related information. Mylyn can integrate with repositories such as Bugzilla, Trac, Redmine, Mantis, JIRA, Unfuddle, and GitHub. It focuses on improving productivity by reducing searching, scrolling, and navigation. By making task context explicit, Mylyn is also meant to facilitate multitasking, planning, reusing past efforts, and sharing expertise.

The project name comes from myelin, an electrically insulating layer that surrounds neurons' axons. The original name of this project, "Mylar", replicated a trademark of a boPET film company, so the Eclipse Foundation changed the project name.

== Features ==
Eclipse IDE features include text editor with syntax coloring, coding assistance, code completion, code refactoring, code analysis with "Quick fix" suggestions along with code debugging.

Along with native support for OSGi, JPMS support has been added as of Java 9.

== Extensions ==
Eclipse supports a rich selection of extensions, adding support for Python via PyDev, Android development via Google's ADT (superseded by Android Studio since 2015), JavaFX via e(fx)clipse, JavaScript, jQuery, and many others at the Eclipse Marketplace. Valable is a Vala plug-in for Eclipse.

In addition to the built-in Java compiler warnings, additional plug-ins are available for linting to improve code quality and consistency such as SpotBugs and Sonar.

Support for build tools such as Ant, Maven, Make, and CMake includes the capability to replace Eclipse native project file format with Maven pom.xml directly.

== Alternative distributions ==
Several alternative distributions exist in the Eclipse project.

=== PHP Development Tools ===
The PHP Hypertext Preprocessor (PHP) Development Tools project provides a framework for the Eclipse platform. The project encompasses all development components, including code-completion, develop PHP and facilitate extensibility. It leverages the existing Eclipse Web Tools Platform (WTP) and Dynamic Languages Toolkit (DLTK).

=== Android Development Tools ===
Android Development Tools (ADT) was superseded in 2015 by the Eclipse foundation's own plugin, called Andmore: Development Tools for Android, after Google discontinued development of their plug-in for the Eclipse IDE, that is designed to provide an integrated environment in which to build Android applications. ADT/Andmore extends the abilities of Eclipse to let developers set up new Android projects, create an application UI, add packages based on the Android Framework API, debug their applications using the Android SDK tools, and export signed (or unsigned) .apk files in order to distribute their applications. It is freely available to download. Google's ADT was the official IDE for Android until 2015 but was replaced by Eclipse's Andmore and the official Android Studio. As of 2024, the project appears to be moribund, with no activity since 2017.

== See also ==
- Comparison of integrated development environments
- Comparison of integrated development environments for Java
- List of Eclipse-based software
- List of Eclipse projects
- List of integrated development environments
- Eclipse Theia

== Sources ==
- Silva, Vladimir (11 March 2009). Practical Eclipse Rich Client Platform Projects (1st ed.). Apress. p. 352. ISBN 978-1-4302-1827-2. Archived from the original on 19 June 2013.
- Burnette, Ed (12 August 2005). Eclipse IDE Pocket Guide (1st ed.). O'Reilly Media. p. 128. ISBN 978-0-596-10065-0. Archived from the original on 7 June 2011.
- Holzner, Steve (1 May 2004). Eclipse (1st ed.). O'Reilly Media. p. 317. ISBN 0-596-00641-1.
- McAffer, Jeff; Lemieux, Jean-Michel; Aniszczyk, Chris (22 May 2010). Eclipse Rich Client Platform (2nd ed.). Addison-Wesley Professional. p. 552. ISBN 978-0-321-60378-4. Archived from the original on 7 July 2012.
- Vogel, Lars (2013). Eclipse IDE: Java programming, debugging, unit testing, task management and Git version control with Eclipse (3rd ed.). Leipzig. ISBN 978-3943747041. Archived from the original on 1 November 2017.
