= Turbo C Sharp =

Discontinued C# IDE

Turbo C#
- Developer: CodeGear
- Initial release: September 5, 2006; 19 years ago
- Operating system: Microsoft Windows
- Type: IDE
- License: Freeware (Explorer); Proprietary software (Professional)

Turbo C# is a discontinued integrated development environment (IDE) for the C# programming language, originally released by the Developer Tools Group of Borland Software Corporation in September 2006. It was a single-language version of Borland Developer Studio 2006 that targeted the Microsoft .NET Framework and the ASP.NET platform, allowing developers to build WinForms and web applications. Turbo C# was part of a broader revival of the Turbo brand alongside Turbo Delphi, Turbo Delphi for .NET, and Turbo C++, aimed at students, hobbyists, and individual professionals.

The product was later distributed by the CodeGear division of Embarcadero Technologies, which purchased Borland's developer tools business in 2008. In October 2009, Embarcadero discontinued support for all Turbo products, including Turbo C#, and the software is no longer available for download.

== History ==
=== Background ===
In 2002, Borland licensed the .NET Framework and SDK from Microsoft and launched .NET versions of its development environment. Borland released C#Builder in 2003 as a C# development tool competing with Visual Studio .NET, code-named "Sidewinder" during development. By the 2005 release, C#Builder had been combined with Delphi for Win32 and Delphi for .NET into a single suite called Borland Developer Studio.

=== Release ===
On August 8, 2006, Borland's Developer Tools Group announced plans to release single-language versions of Borland Developer Studio as a new line of Turbo products, reviving the Turbo brand name that had been absent from the market since the mid-1990s. The four products — Turbo Delphi for Win32, Turbo Delphi for .NET, Turbo C++, and Turbo C# — were made available on September 5, 2006, in English, French, German, and Japanese.

Each Turbo product was available in two editions. The Explorer edition was a free download intended for students, hobbyists, and beginning programmers, and functioned as a fixed, all-in-one IDE. The Professional edition, priced at US$399 (with academic pricing under $100), was extensible and customizable, and could accept third-party tools, components, and plug-ins. Only one Turbo product could be installed on a given machine at a time.

=== Discontinuation ===
On February 8, 2006, Borland had announced plans to divest its IDE division. On November 14, 2006, Borland formed CodeGear as a wholly owned subsidiary to manage its developer tools product lines. In May 2008, Borland sold the CodeGear division to Embarcadero Technologies for approximately $23 million. In October 2009, Embarcadero discontinued support for Turbo C# along with the other Turbo products. The software is no longer available for download, and registration keys, which were required to use the product, can no longer be obtained from Embarcadero.

== Features ==
Turbo C# was based on the Borland Developer Studio 2006 codebase and targeted version 1.1 of the .NET Framework (rather than the then-current version 2.0). The IDE descended from the environment Borland inherited with its 2002 acquisition of TogetherSoft and was shared across the other Turbo products.

The IDE featured a layout similar to Visual Studio, with a control palette, property window, and project explorer, and supported visual rapid application development using drag-and-drop .NET controls. Notable features included:

- Full UML class diagram modeling with code generation, inherited from the Together technology
- Integrated code refactoring tools
- Unit testing support
- Code completion (Code Insight) and live templates
- Code revision history
- ASP.NET application development using the Cassini web server
- Bundled InterBase database (up to 20 simultaneous users) and MSDE 2000 support
- Over 200 pre-built drag-and-drop components (in the Professional edition)

The Professional edition additionally offered remote debugging, additional code templates, a code repository for reuse, and an extensible architecture supporting third-party plug-ins.

System requirements included a 1.4 GHz Pentium III/4/M processor, 512 KB of memory, and 300 MB of disk space (separate from the .NET Framework and SDK).

== Reception ==
Visual Studio Magazine in March 2007 praised Turbo C# as a "comprehensive and inexpensive IDE" for building rich client and ASP.NET applications. The review noted that its UML modeling capabilities offered a more full-featured treatment than the class diagrams available with Visual Studio, and highlighted the bundled unit testing, integrated database, web server, and refactoring tools as advantages over Visual Studio Express, which was also free. However, the review identified the limitation to .NET Framework 1.1 as a significant caveat, and noted overlap with Visual Studio editions as a drawback.

OSnews in September 2006 noted that the Turbo Explorer line included over 200 components for building programs, but cautioned that the abundance of features might be overwhelming to new users.

== See also ==
- Turbo C++
- Turbo Delphi
- Turbo C
- Borland Developer Studio
- C#
