= Turbo Delphi =

- Developer: Borland / CodeGear
- Release: September 5, 2006; 19 years ago
- Stable release: Update 3 (Hotfix #12) / March 23, 2007; 19 years ago
- Written in: Delphi (Object Pascal)
- Operating system: Windows 2000 and later
- Platform: IA-32
- Available in: English
- Type: IDE
- License: Freeware (Explorer); Proprietary (Professional)
- Website: www.turboexplorer.com (defunct)

Turbo Delphi is a discontinued integrated development environment (IDE), created by CodeGear, for student, amateur, individual professionals, and hobbyist programmers. It used the programming language Delphi, which is a dialect of Object Pascal.

== History ==
On August 8, 2006, the Developer Tools Group of Borland Software Corporation announced plans to release single-language versions of Borland Developer Studio, which included Turbo Delphi for Win32, Turbo Delphi for .NET, Turbo C++, and Turbo C#. The Turbo Explorer versions were freeware downloadable versions, and Turbo Professional versions were priced at less than $500. The Turbo brand name, most prominently associated with Turbo Pascal in the 1980s and early 1990s, was revived by Borland as a marketing strategy to rekindle developer interest in its tools. On September 5, 2006, the Developer Tools Group of Borland Software Corporation announced the initial releases of the Turbo products.

== Versions ==
There were two versions of Turbo Delphi: one which generated native Win32 applications (Turbo Delphi for Windows), and one that generated bytecode for the Microsoft .NET Framework CLR. Each version came in two editions: a free Explorer edition and a Professional edition. The Professional edition was a commercial product available for purchase from Borland/Embarcadero, and it allowed extension and customization of the IDE that was not available in the Explorer edition.

== Updates ==
Following the initial release, Turbo Delphi received several updates through hotfixes released for the underlying Borland Developer Studio 2006 platform:

- Update 1 (February 14, 2007) – Hotfix Rollup #1–#10
- Update 2 (March 7, 2007) – Hotfix #11
- Update 3 (March 23, 2007) – Hotfix #12

A subsequent Update 4 (Hotfix #13), released on June 14, 2007, was explicitly not made available for the Turbo product line.

== Technical specifications ==
The minimum supported operating system was Windows 2000. The compiler was based on the Delphi 2006 compiler, supporting .NET Framework 1.1. Database support was limited to InterBase 7.5 and MySQL 4.0.

== Ownership changes ==
Turbo Delphi was most recently distributed by the CodeGear division of Embarcadero Technologies, which was purchased from Borland in 2008.

== Discontinuation ==
In October 2009, Embarcadero discontinued support of Turbo Delphi, along with the other Turbo products including Turbo C++ Builder. The product is no longer available for download, and it is not possible to receive a registration key from Embarcadero, which was required to use the product. The latest release of Turbo Delphi was based upon Embarcadero's product Delphi 2006.

Following the discontinuation of Turbo products, the offer was replaced by a free trial version of Embarcadero Delphi XE Starter edition.

== See also ==
- Borland Developer Studio
- Delphi (software)
- Turbo C++
- Turbo C#
- Turbo Pascal
