= Entera =

Entera is a middleware product introduced in the mid-1990s by the Open Environment Corporation (OEC), an early implementation of the three-tiered client–server model development model. Entera viewed business software as a collection of services, rather than as a monolithic application.

Entera was designed to allow companies to build and manage large, multinational information systems, while preserving existing investments in skill sets, hardware and software systems. The multi-tiered architecture solved problems that were inherent in first generation client/server application development, including the lack of scalability, manageability, application security, and vendor lock-in. Entera was built on industry-standard distributed computing infrastructures, and supported a variety of programming languages with a management framework.

After its origination with OEC, and OEC’s purchase by Borland Software, the rights to Entera were acquired by eCube Systems LLC in 2003. Today, Entera and NXTera, are still used by Fortune 1000 companies in several countries and developed, maintained and marketed by eCube Systems.

== History ==
In 1992, Open Environment Corporation (“OEC”), located in Cambridge, Massachusetts, released a middleware product called “OEC Toolkit.” The product, which eventually would become known as “Entera,” was the first middleware product sold as an application server platform. In subsequent years, the company added to Entera three-tier application monitoring called AppMinder, and a transaction processing system called Entera FX. Over the next nine years, OEC sold tens of millions of dollars' worth of Entera to at least 300 Fortune 1000 customers. In 1995 OEC went public, completing its initial public offering on the NASDAQ stock exchange under ticker Nasdaq: OPEN.

While continuing to develop Entera, two primary versions of the software were developed: the Transmission Control Protocol (TCP) version and the Distributed Computing Environment (DCE), the latter based on DCS Cell Directory Service, the DCE endpoint mapper, and DCE threads. Despite various challenges, the DCE version of Entera became popular with IBM and its customer base because it simplified the complexity of DCE development.

During this time, OEC developers began work on a fourth version of Entera, aimed at unifying the TCP and DCE versions. They used the DCE and endpoint mapper to provide stability and increased performance. This newer version implemented multithreading and broker persistence. Prior to its acquisition, OEC developed a number of products including the OEC Toolkit, Encompass, Netminder, Entera Workbench, Oec3270, Appminder, Entera OLE, and Entera FX.

=== Borland acquisition ===
In 1996, a year after going public, OEC was acquired by Borland. Borland continued to invest in Entera, but the software peaked in popularity. At this time, over 300 Fortune 1000 companies were using Entera worldwide.

During the post-buyout transition phase, the original Entera development team underwent some changes. Entera 4.0 was released prematurely, causing problems with its use as a replacement for Entera 3.2. Borland responded by releasing version 4.1, which proved to be a more stable version. In 2000 the most stable version, 4.2.1, was released.

Over the next few years, Borland sold hundreds of copies of Entera to new and former Entera customers. During this time, Borland also developed a professional services organizations, capable of working in diverse programming environments.

In November 1997, Borland announced its acquisition of Visigenic Software (VSGN), a CORBA vendor and the developer of VisiBroker. VisiBroker overlapped some of Entera’s capabilities while adding support for the Java programming language, object-orientation and a degree of complexity to distributed computing.

During the following year, Borland refocused its efforts on targeting enterprise applications development. They spent less time on developing Entera and turned their attention to Visibroker. Borland changed its name to Inprise, a fusion of “integrating and enterprise.” Their new aim was to integrate Borland’s tools including Delphi, C++Builder, and JBuilder with Visigenic’s COBRA-based Visibroker for C++ and Java.

With their efforts concentrated on Visigenic Software, Borland unsuccessfully attempted to switch Entera users to Visibroker, before ultimately discontinuing active development of Entera in 2001. Even while experiencing growth within its customer base, Borland quietly reallocated Entera development resources.

=== eCube acquires license ===
Borland licensed the rights to Entera to eCube Systems LLC in 2002 to provide a migration path for existing clients and to enable further development of the Entera platform. eCube Systems was started by former OEC and Borland engineers and architects who still wanted to develop the product.

eCube Systems continues to support and develop existing Entera installations today. The latest version of Entera is called NXTera. It has added new technology models and allows for interoperability with contemporary middleware technologies including messaging platforms and web service standards such as SOAP and REST.

In July 2009, Micro Focus acquired Borland for $75 million. In February 2012 Micro Focus and eCube Systems announced their cooperation in the delivery of middleware consulting. Today eCube and Micro Focus collaborate on a variety of middleware projects.
