= Virtual Pascal =

Free 32-bit Pascal compiler, IDE, and debugger for OS/2 and Microsoft Windows

- Original author: Vitaly Miryanov
- Developer: Allan Mertner
- Initial release: 1995; 31 years ago
- Stable release: 2.1.279 / May 13, 2004; 21 years ago
- Written in: Object Pascal, assembly language
- Operating system: Windows, OS/2, Linux
- Platform: IA-32
- Type: Compiler, integrated development environment
- License: Freeware (Windows, OS/2 2.0 or later, Linux)
- Website: vpascal.com (archived), Online community

Virtual Pascal is a freeware 32-bit Pascal programming language compiler, integrated development environment (IDE), and debugger for OS/2 and Microsoft Windows, with some limited Linux support. Virtual Pascal was developed by Vitaly Miryanov and later maintained by Allan Mertner.

== Features ==
The compiler is compatible with Turbo Pascal, Borland Delphi, and Free Pascal, although language- and RTL-compatibility is limited for features introduced after Delphi v2 and FPC 1.0.x.

VP was mainly used for these purposes:

- Easily port existing 16-bit Turbo Pascal programs to 32 bits
- Port existing 16-bit Object Windows Library (OWL) programs to 32-bit Windows (in theory)
- Write console (text-mode) programs for several platforms
- Pascal development using the 32-bit Windows API (the classic development, no COM)
- Learn object-oriented programming

Significant features of Virtual Pascal include:

- Text-mode IDE
- Debugger is integrated directly into the IDE and is reminiscent of Turbo Debugger
- Fast compiling
- Tool-chain written mostly in x86 assembly language

== History ==
=== Microsoft Windows, OS/2 ===
The compiler was quite popular in the Bulletin board system (BBS) scene, probably because of its OS/2 port and being one of the few affordable multi-target compilers. Also Turbo Pascal had been popular in the BBS scene too, but its successor, Delphi was suddenly for Windows only. Virtual Pascal provided a migration path for existing codebases.

There has been pressure from some users to license Virtual Pascal as open-source software. This has not been done, for these reasons:

- The compiler source code is mostly written in x86 assembly language which is hard to change and maintain.
- Part of the run-time library is proprietary to Borland (The Free Pascal run-time library was ported to VirtualPascal by Noah Silva, however newer versions of the Free Pascal RTL use features of the Free Pascal compiler which are unsupported by VirtualPascal, and so cannot be ported).
- The patch/diff tool to work around the above (provide changes to proprietary without distributing parts of the original) was proprietary and (Windows) 16-bit only.
- Documentation and help are maintained with expensive (and sometimes no longer available) proprietary tools
- There is nobody who fully understands the code. Allan said that some of the deeper areas were no-touch for him (original code by Vitaly)

Although it had a wide user base in the late 1990s, VP has not evolved significantly since 2001, and after a few maintenance-only releases, the owner declared that development had ceased in 2005.

On 4 Apr 2005, Virtual Pascal was announced 'dead' on the official site. The last released version (2.1 Build 279) was announced on 13 May 2004.

=== Linux ===
An initial version was released on 4 July 1999, with the last known version released on 26 September 1999. This version was maintained by Jörg Pleumann. Run-Time Library to 32-bit DPMI.

== See also ==
- Free Pascal
