= DbExpress =

dbExpress is Embarcadero's data driver architecture that replaced the older Borland Database Engine. First released with Borland Delphi 6 and C++Builder 6, it has gone through several iterations itself, the latest being shipped with Embarcadero Delphi and C++ Builder RX 10 Seattle. It provides unidirectional database access, that means you can traverse data obtained from a database table only in the forward direction. You cannot go back, unless you add other layers. This makes dbExpress a very fast access technology, compared to many others. Updates has to be done with other in the IDE integrated components as the "DatasetProvider", which assembles automatically appropriate Update-Statements ( in SQL ).

Embarcadero supplies drivers for many databases, including Oracle, Firebird, InterBase, IBM Db2, Informix, SQL Server, MySQL and ODBC. Additional drivers are available from third parties. Starting with Delphi 2007 (dbExpress 4 generation) a tracing driver is included as well which allows for logging all statements sent to the database.

Prior to version 4 of dbExpress the drivers used the Microsoft COM technology and most drivers were not unicode enabled. Nowadays the drivers are written in Delphi itself and source code for most parts is available. Most drivers today are unicode enabled since Delphi itself switched to unicode with version 2009.
