= CodeWright =

Source code editor

- Developer(s): CodeGear
- Stable release: 7.5
- Operating system: Microsoft Windows
- Type: Source code editor
- License: proprietary commercial software

CodeWright is a Windows Programmers Editing System for software developers originally marketed by Premia Corp. (Beaverton, Oregon) and developed by Premia co-founders Eric Johnson and Don Kinzer, initially released in 1991. Premia was acquired in April 2000 by Starbase Corp. which was itself acquired in January 2003 by Borland.

CodeWright can be configured to work with other integrated development environment (IDE) systems, and synchronize with IDEs on the fly. Support for version control systems, compilers, error files is available. The editor can be extended via DLLs.

== Overview ==
CodeWright was a crossover product at a critical time in the history of Windows. A popular editor for programmers at the time was Brief, a DOS-only product that was valuable due to its early-day EMACS-like features, especially split-screen and extensive macro capability.

Much as being Brief-like was an advantage in the DOS and early Windows era, by 2000 having "CodeWright editing features" was a marketing advantage. Since the makers of Brief were not moving to a Windows-based editor, that left it to other parties.

CodeWright was the first Windows editor that offered equivalent or better facilities as Brief, and would even emulate Brief. Additionally, CodeWright arrived at the same time as hardware graphics acceleration was arriving for Windows, removing at a stroke one of the biggest obstacles to the use of Windows, the slow redraw times that made quickly browsing through large code bases difficult or impossible in Windows.

Despite its wide initial popularity, CodeWright would be eclipsed rapidly by a growing number of IDEs available for Windows, which offered similar features as CodeWright, and typically were better integrated to the specific language at hand.

== Features ==
CodeWright is project-based. Within projects one can define and load everything and also make use of Microsoft Visual Studio libraries (or .Net) and the Java Class Libraries. Features such as Syntax Highlighting and Code completion can be readily changed.

It also enables extending the IDE by writing CodeWright-specific API scripts, Visual Basic scripts and Perl scripts.

== CodeWright Fusion ==
The company's Fusion product, introduced mid-1990s, existed as both 16- and 32-bit versions, in support of programmers doing C++ development.

== Discontinuation ==
Borland is no longer renewing support contracts and is no longer engaging in new development.

CodeWright was acquired by Embarcadero Technologies as part CodeGear from Borland in 2008. CodeWright is currently sold by Embarcadero Technologies.
