= Turbo C++ =

Compiler and IDE from Borland

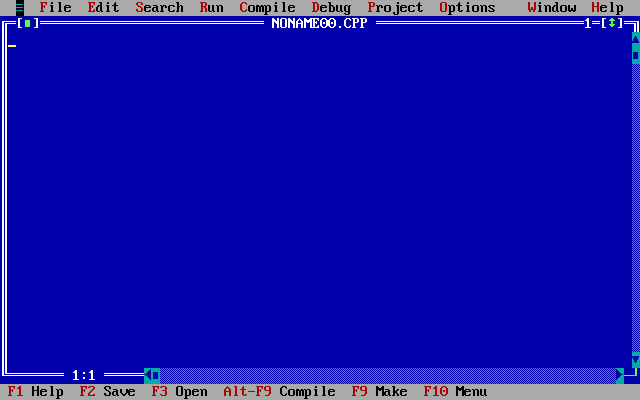
- Screenshot of the Turbo C++ IDE
- Developer: Borland
- Release: May 1990
- Stable release: 2006 / September 5, 2006
- Operating system: Microsoft Windows
- Type: IDE
- License: Freeware (Explorer); Proprietary (Professional)
- Website: www.turboexplorer.com (2006)

Turbo C++ is a discontinued C++ compiler and integrated development environment originally from Borland. It was designed as a home and hobbyist counterpart for Borland C++. As the developer focused more on professional programming tools, later Turbo C++ products were made as scaled down versions of its professional compilers.

== History ==
=== Borland Turbo C++ ===
Turbo C++ 1.0, running on MS-DOS, was released in May 1990. An OS/2 version was produced as well. Version 1.01 was released on February 28, 1991, running on MS-DOS. The latter was able to generate both COM and EXE programs and was shipped with Borland's Turbo Assembler for Intel x86 processors. The initial version of the Turbo C++ compiler was based on a front end developed by TauMetric (later acquired by Sun Microsystems and their front end was incorporated in Sun C++ 4.0, which shipped in 1994). This compiler supported the AT&T 2.0 release of C++.

Turbo C++ 3.0 was released on November 20, 1991, amidst expectations of the coming release of Turbo C++ for Microsoft Windows. Initially released as an MS-DOS compiler, 3.0 supported C++ templates, Borland's inline assembler and generation of MS-DOS mode executables for both 8086 real mode and 286 protected mode (as well as 80186). 3.0 implemented AT&T C++ 2.1, the most recent at the time. The separate Turbo Assembler product was no longer included, but the inline-assembler could stand in as a reduced functionality version.

Soon after the release of Windows 3.0, Borland updated Turbo C++ to support Windows application development. The Turbo C++ 3.0 for Windows product was quickly followed by Turbo C++ 3.1.

It's possible that the jump from version 1.x to version 3.x was in part an attempt to link Turbo C++ release numbers with Microsoft Windows versions; however, it seems more likely that this jump was simply to synchronize Turbo C and Turbo C++, since Turbo C 2.0 (1989) and Turbo C++ 1.0 (1990) had come out roughly at the same time, and the next generation 3.0 was a merger of both the C and C++ compiler.

Starting with version 3.0, Borland segmented their C++ compiler into two distinct product lines: "Turbo C++" and "Borland C++". Turbo C++ was marketed toward the hobbyist and entry-level compiler market, while Borland C++ targeted the professional application development market. Borland C++ included additional tools, compiler code optimization, and documentation to address the needs of commercial developers. Turbo C++ 3.0 could be upgraded with separate add-ons, such as Turbo Assembler and Turbo Vision 1.0.

Turbo C++ 4.0 was released in November 1993 and is notable (among other things) for its robust support of templates. In particular, Borland C++ 4 was instrumental in the development of the Standard Template Library, expression templates, and the first advanced applications of template metaprogramming. With the success of the Pascal-evolved product Borland Delphi, Borland ceased work on their Borland C++ suite and concentrated on C++Builder for Windows. C++Builder shared Delphi's front-end application framework but retained the Borland C++ back-end compiler. Active development on Borland C++/Turbo C++ was suspended until 2006 (see below.)

Turbo C++ 4.5 was announced on March 20, 1995. New features include multimedia QuickTour, five new games (Turbo Meteors (an Asteroids-like game), Turbo Blocks, Turbo Cribbage, Turbo 21, Turbo Mah Jongg) with corresponding source codes. It includes the ObjectWindows Library (OWL) 2.5, AppExpert, ClassExpert, and Object Components Framework.

==== Borland Japan Turbo C++ ====
Version 4.0J supports DOS for PC-9801 and PC/AT (DOS/V). It includes Turbo Debugger 4.0. The IDE uses XMS memory. The project manager supports linking OBJ/LIB libraries, and integration with Turbo Assembler 4.0J.

Version 5.0J was announced on 1996-07-23. Based on Borland C++ 5.0J, this version includes an IDE supporting Windows 95 and NT 3.51, and can compile 16-bit software. It includes ObjectWindows Library 5.0, Borland Database Engine, and Visual Database Tools.

=== Borland Turbo C++ Suite ===
This version includes Borland C++Builder 1.0, Turbo C++ 4.5 for Windows 3.1, and Turbo C++ 3.0 for DOS. Later release replaces C++Builder 1.0 with Borland C++BuilderX Personal Edition.

=== Turbo C++ 2006 ===
It is a single language version of Borland Developer Studio 2006 for C++ language, originally announced in 2006-08-06, and was released later on 2006-09-05 the same year with Turbo Explorer and Turbo Professional editions. The Explorer edition was free to download and distribute while the Professional edition was a commercial product.

In October 2009 Embarcadero Technologies discontinued support of all Turbo C++ 2006 editions. As such, the Explorer edition is no longer available for download and the Professional edition is no longer available for purchase from Embarcadero Technologies. Turbo C++ 2006 was succeeded by C++Builder 2007 before Embarcadero's acquisition of CodeGear and dropping support, and the official Turbo C++ 2006 page has later redirected a visitor to C++ Builder 2010.

=== Freeware releases ===
Turbo C++ v1.01 was released on 2002-02-21 by Inprise Corporation.

== Legacy software ==
- Turbo C++ v1.01 and Turbo C v2.01 can be downloaded, free of charge, from Borland's Antique Software website.
- Turbo C++ 3.0 (DOS) was included in the Turbo C Suite 1.0, which is no longer sold by Borland.

== See also ==
- Borland C++
- Comparison of integrated development environments
- Turbo C
