= Turbo Assembler =

Computer assembler developed by Borland

- Developer: Borland
- Release: 1988; 38 years ago
- Stable release: 5.4
- Operating system: MS-DOS, Windows
- Type: Assembler
- License: Proprietary
- Website: Official webpage at the Wayback Machine (archived October 23, 2010)

Turbo Assembler (TASM) is an assembler for software development published by Borland in 1988. It runs on and produces code for 16- or 32-bit x86 MS-DOS and compatibles for Microsoft Windows. It can be used with Borland's other language products: Turbo Pascal, Turbo Basic, Turbo C, and Turbo C++. The Turbo Assembler package is bundled with Turbo Linker and is interoperable with Turbo Debugger.

Borland advertised Turbo Assembler as being 2-3 times faster than its primary competitor, Microsoft Macro Assembler (MASM). TASM can assemble source in a MASM-compatible mode or an ideal mode with a few enhancements. Object-oriented programming was added in version 3. The last version of Turbo Assembler is 5.4, with files dated 1996 and patches up to 2010; it is still included with Delphi and C++Builder.

TASM itself is a 16-bit program. It will run on 16- and 32-bit versions of Windows, and produce code for the same versions, but it does not generate 64-bit x86 code. Turbo Assembler 5.0 (at least) also contains a 32-bit PE version of tasm called TASM32.EXE.

== Example ==
A Turbo Assembler program that prints 'Merry Christmas!':

.model small
.stack	100h
.data
msg	db "Merry christmas!",'$'
.code
main	proc
    mov ax, SEG msg
	mov	ds, ax
	mov	dx, offset msg
	mov	ah, 9
	int	21h
	mov	ax, 4c00h
	int	21h
main	endp
end	main

== Reception ==
In a review of three assemblers, Michael Blaszczak of BYTE in February 1989 found that Turbo Assembler was slower than SLR OPTASM but faster than and very compatible with MASM. He liked the tutorial on assembly programming and "excellent" sample code, but criticized the paucity of reference documentation. Noting that it was the only assembler that "cleanly assembled everything I fed to it", Blaszczak concluded that TASM was his favorite as it was "the best of both worlds: MASM compatibility without MASM's glitches", especially for those new to assembly.

== See also ==
- Comparison of assemblers
- A86 - contemporary of Turbo Assembler
- MASM - contemporary of Turbo Assembler
- FASM - More recent x86 assembler
