= Turbo Pascal =

Computer programming language

- Original author: Anders Hejlsberg (at Borland)
- Developer: Borland
- Release: 20 November 1983; 42 years ago
- Operating system: CP/M, CP/M-86, MS-DOS, Windows 3.x, Classic Mac OS
- Platform: Z80, x86, 68000, PC-98
- Available in: English
- Type: Integrated development environment

Turbo Pascal is a software development system that includes a compiler and an integrated development environment (IDE) for the programming language Pascal running on the operating systems CP/M, CP/M-86, and MS-DOS. It was originally developed by Anders Hejlsberg at Borland, and was notable for its very fast compiling. Turbo Pascal, and the later but similar Turbo C, made Borland a leader in PC-based development tools.

For versions 6 and 7 (the last two versions), both a lower-priced Turbo Pascal and more expensive Borland Pascal were produced; Borland Pascal was oriented more toward professional software development, with more libraries and standard library source code. The name Borland Pascal is also used more generically for Borland's dialect of the language Pascal, significantly different from Standard Pascal.

Borland has released three old versions of Turbo Pascal free of charge because of their historical interest: the original Turbo Pascal (now known as 1.0), and versions 3.02 and 5.5 for DOS, while Borland's French office released version 7.01 on its FTP.

== History ==
Philippe Kahn first saw an opportunity for Borland, his newly formed software company, in the field of programming tools. Historically, the vast majority of programmers saw their workflow in terms of the edit/compile/link cycle, with separate tools dedicated to each task. Programmers wrote source code using a text editor; the source code was then compiled into object code (often requiring multiple passes), and a linker combined object code with runtime libraries to produce an executable program.

In the early IBM PC market (1981–1983) the major programming tool vendors all made compilers that worked in a similar fashion. For example, the Microsoft Pascal system consisted of two compiler passes and a final linking pass (which could take minutes on systems with only floppy disks for secondary storage, even though programs were very much smaller than they are today). This process was less resource-intensive than the later integrated development environment (IDE). Vendors of software development tools aimed their products at professional developers, and the price for these basic tools plus ancillary tools like profilers ran into the hundreds of US dollars.

Kahn's idea was to package all these functions in an integrated programming toolkit designed to have much better performance and resource utilization than the usual professional development tools, and charge a low price for a package integrating a custom text editor, compiler, and all functionality needed to produce executable programs. The program was sold by direct mail order for US$49.95, without going through established sales channels (retailers or resellers).

The Turbo Pascal compiler was based on the Blue Label Pascal compiler originally produced for the NasSys cassette-based operating system of the Nascom microcomputer in 1981 by Anders Hejlsberg. Borland licensed Hejlsberg's "PolyPascal" compiler core (Poly Data was the name of Hejlsberg's company in Denmark), and added the user interface and editor. Anders Hejlsberg joined the company as an employee and was the architect for all versions of the Turbo Pascal compiler and the first three versions of Borland Delphi.

The compiler was first released as Compas Pascal for CP/M, and then released on 20 November 1983 as Turbo Pascal for CP/M (including the Apple II fitted with a Z-80 SoftCard, effectively converting the 6502-based Apple into a CP/M machine, the Commodore 64 with CP/M cartridge, and the later DEC Rainbow), CP/M-86, and DOS machines. On its launch in the United States market, Turbo Pascal retailed for US$49.99, a very low price for a compiler at the time. The integrated Pascal compiler was of good quality compared to other Pascal products of the time.

The Turbo name alluded to the speed of compiling and of the executables produced. The edit/compile/run cycle was fast compared to other Pascal implementations because everything related to building the program was stored in RAM, and because it was a one-pass compiler written in assembly language. Compiling was much faster than compilers for other languages (even Borland's own later compilers for C), and other Pascal compilers, and programmer time was also saved since the program could be compiled and run from the IDE. The execution speed of these COM-format programs was a revelation for developers whose only prior experience programming microcomputers was with interpreted BASIC or UCSD Pascal, which compiled to p-code which was then interpreted at runtime.

Unlike some other development tools, Turbo Pascal disks had no copy protection. Turbo Pascal came with the "Book License": "You must treat this software just like a book ... [it] may be used by any number of people ... may be freely moved from one computer location to another, so long as there is no possibility of it being used at one location while it's being used at another."

=== Reception ===
Borland sold about 250,000 copies of Turbo Pascal in two years, which Bruce F. Webster of Byte described as "an amazing figure for a computer language". He reported six months later that the figure had risen to "more than 400,000 copies in a marketplace that had been estimated as having only 30,000 potential buyers".

Jerry Pournelle wrote in the magazine in February 1984 that Turbo Pascal "comes close to what I think the computer industry is headed for: well documented, standard, plenty of good features, and a reasonable price". He disliked the requirement to buy another license to distribute binaries, but noted that "it turns out not to be a lot more. Borland only wants another $100" atop the $49.95 base price, and that "my first impression of Turbo is that it's probably worth $149.95. It looks to do everything MT+ with the Speed Programming Package does, and maybe even do it faster and better". Pournelle reported in July that Turbo 2.0's overlays "[allow] you to write big programs". According to Kahn, IBM had refused to resell Turbo Pascal unless the price was at least $200; Pournelle noted that "Turbo is much better than the Pascal IBM sells", and unlike the latter was compatible with the IBM PCjr. Three Byte reviewers praised Turbo Pascal in the same issue. One reviewer said that because of dialect differences "Turbo is not really Pascal. But it's very useful". While cautioning that it was not suitable for developing very large applications, he concluded that Turbo Pascal "is well written, fun to use at times, and fast enough to make up for its few shortcomings ... it is a bargain that shouldn't be passed up". A second called the DOS version "without doubt, the best software value I have ever purchased", while a third said that Borland "deserves praise for" the "high-value" CP/M version.

Also in July 1984, Creative Computing favorably compared Turbo Pascal to what the reviewer described as mediocre and expensive Pascals from UCSD, IBM, and Microsoft. He reported converting code written in IBM Pascal in less than 30 minutes, and that "under IBM Pascal, the average program took two weeks to write. With Turbo Pascal, the average is now two days". While noting the .COM and 64 KB limitations, the reviewer approved of Turbo's close adherence to the Jensen and Wirth language standard. The documentation was, he wrote, of "above average readability" and superior to IBM Pascal's. "My only fear", the review concluded, was that "it is grossly underpriced, and I worry that people might fail to take it seriously". "Turbo Pascal is the Pascal to acquire", Computer Language in September said of version 2.0. Praising its speed, extensions including PC graphics and sound, documentation, ease of using overlays, and "highly standard syntax", the magazine recommended Turbo to both new and experienced programmers. PC Magazine was similarly complimentary in November, stating that "nothing like Turbo Pascal has ever existed for PC-DOS before". It praised 2.0's low price, speed, stability, ease of implementing overlays, and unusually good documentation for a compiler, and noted the existence of many utilities for Turbo Pascal from other companies. The review stated that the IDE that simplified the edit-compile-run-debug loop made Turbo Pascal accessible, like BASIC, to new programmers.

Pournelle in August 1985 called version 3.0 "a distinct improvement on the already impressive version 2" and said that the new book license "seems quite fair to me". He said that "Turbo Pascal has got to be the best value in languages on the market today", and that Borland led the industry in "delivering excellent products at reasonable costs". Webster also praised 3.0, stating in August 1985 that Turbo Pascal "is best known for its small size, incredible compile speeds, and fast execution times". He noted that the software's quality and low price was especially surprising after the "JRT Pascal fiasco", and stated that even at the new higher $69.95 price, it was "probably still the best software deal on the market". Despite finding what the magazine called "a serious bug" in 3.0, and decreased compatibility with PC clones, Byte in February 1986 stated that "it is hard to avoid recommending Turbo to anyone who wants to program in Pascal", citing improved speed and graphic routines. When reviewing four other Pascal compilers in December 1986, the magazine described Turbo Pascal 3.0 as "practical and attractive to programmers at all levels of expertise".

Besides allowing applications larger than 64 KB, Byte in 1988 reported substantially faster compiling and executing for version 4.0, and that although it did not maintain previous versions' "almost total" backward compatibility, conversion was fast and easy. The reviewer concluded, "I highly recommend Turbo Pascal 4.0 as an addition to any programmer's software repertoire".

Byte in 1989 listed Turbo C and Turbo Pascal as among the "Distinction" winners of the Byte Awards. Citing their user interface and continued emphasis on speed, the magazine stated that "for rapid prototyping there's not much better". In the same issue Pournelle again praised version 4.0 and 5.0 of Turbo Pascal. Citing Anacreon as "a good example of how complex a program you can write in Pascal", and the many libraries from Borland and other developers, he wrote "I think it may well be the language for the rest of us".

InfoWorld in 1991 said that Turbo Pascal for Windows 1.0 at $249 "continues to offer power, speed, simplicity, and a price/performance ratio that is one of the best in the industry". The magazine stated that Turbo "is definitely more Windows-oriented than Borland C++", improved on the latter's already excellent IDE, and "included some of the best documentation we've seen", with "the fastest turnaround from code to test we've seen in a low-level Windows programming environment". InfoWorld recommended it to "any Windows programmer".

Scott MacGregor of Microsoft said that Bill Gates "couldn't understand why our stuff was so slow" compared to Turbo Pascal. "He would bring in poor Greg Whitten [programming director of Microsoft languages] and yell at him for half an hour" because their company was unable to defeat Kahn's small startup, MacGregor recalled.

=== Successors ===
By 1995 Borland had dropped Turbo/Borland Pascal and replaced it with the rapid application development (RAD) environment Borland Delphi, based on Object Pascal. The 32- and 64-bit Delphi versions still support the more portable Pascal enhancements of the earlier products (i.e., those not specific to 16-bit code) including the earlier static object model. This language backwards compatibility means much old Turbo Pascal code can still be compiled and run in a modern environment today.

In 2006, Borland revived the Turbo brand name for a new line of single-language IDEs based on Borland Developer Studio 2006, including Turbo Delphi, Turbo C++, and Turbo C#. These products were discontinued in October 2009.

Other suppliers have produced software development tools compatible with Turbo Pascal. The best-known are Free Pascal and Virtual Pascal.

== Features ==
=== Assembly language ===
While all versions of Turbo Pascal could include inline machine code, starting with version 6 it was possible to integrate assembly language within Pascal source code.

Support for the various x86 memory models was provided by inline assembly, compiler options, and language extensions such as the "absolute" keyword. The Turbo Assembler, TASM, a standard x86 assembler independent of TP, and source-compatible with the widely used Microsoft Macro Assembler MASM, was supplied with the enhanced "Borland Pascal" versions.

=== Debugging and profiling ===
The IDE provided several debugging facilities, including single stepping, examination and changing of variables, and conditional breakpoints. In later versions assembly-language blocks could be stepped through. The user could add breakpoints on variables and registers in an IDE window. Programs using IBM PC graphics mode could flip between graphics and text mode automatically or manually, or display both on two screens. For cases where the relatively simple debugging facilities of the IDE were insufficient, Turbopower Software produced a more powerful debugger, T-Debug. The same company produced Turbo Analyst and Overlay Manager for Turbo Pascal. T-Debug was later updated for Turbo Pascal 4, but discontinued with the release of Borland's Turbo Debugger (TD), which also allowed some hardware intervention on computers equipped with the new 80386 processor.

TD was usually supplied in conjunction with the Turbo Assembler and the Turbo Profiler, a code profiler that reported on the time spent in each part of the program to assist program optimisation by finding bottlenecks. The books included with Borland Pascal had detailed descriptions of the Intel assembler language, including the number of clock cycles required by each instruction. Development and debugging could be carried out entirely within the IDE unless the advanced debugging facilities of Turbopower T-Debug, and later TD, were required.

Later versions also supported remote debugging via an RS-232 communication cable.

=== Units ===
Over the years, Borland enhanced not only the IDE, but also extended the programming language. A development system based on ISO standard Pascal requires implementation-specific extensions for the development of real-world applications on the platforms they target. Standard Pascal is designed to be platform-independent, so prescribes no low-level access to hardware- or operating system-dependent facilities. Standard Pascal also does not prescribe how a large program should be split into separate compiling units. From version 4, Turbo Pascal adopted the concept of units from UCSD Pascal. Units were used as external function libraries, like the object files used in other languages such as FORTRAN or C.

For example, the line uses crt; in a program included the unit called crt; the uses is the mechanism for using other compiling units. interface and implementation were the keywords used to specify, within the unit, what was (and what was not) visible outside the unit. This is similar to the public and private keywords in other languages such as C++ and Java.

Units in Borland's Pascal were similar to Modula-2's separate compiling system. In 1987, when Turbo Pascal 4 was released, Modula-2 was making inroads as an educational language which could replace Pascal. Borland, in fact, had a Turbo Modula-2 compiler, but only released it on CP/M (its user interface was almost identical to that of Turbo Pascal 1–3) with little marketing. A much improved DOS version was developed, but as Borland was unwilling to publish the results, the authors including Niels Jensen bought the rights and formed Jensen & Partners International to publish it as JPI TopSpeed Modula-2. Instead Borland chose to implement separate compiling in their established Pascal product.

Separate compiling was not part of the standard Pascal language, but was already available in UCSD Pascal, which was very popular on 8-bit machines. Turbo Pascal syntax for units appears to have been borrowed from UCSD Pascal. Earlier versions of Turbo Pascal, designed for computers with limited resources, supported a "chain and execute" system of dynamic linking for separately compiled objects, similar to the system widely used in BASIC. Also, the language had a statement to include separate source code in a program when necessary, and overlaying was supported from TP3, but, as with overlays, chained objects had to fit into the original (limited) program memory space. As computing and storage facilities advanced, the ability to generate large EXE files was added to Turbo Pascal, with the ability to statically link and collectively load separately compiled objects.

The .TPU files output by compiling a Turbo Pascal unit are tightly linked to the internal structures of the compiler, rather than standard .OBJ linkable files. This improved compiling and linking times, but meant that .TPU files could not be linked with the output of other languages or even used with different releases of Turbo Pascal unless recompiled from source.

=== Object-oriented programming ===
From version 5.5 some object-oriented programming features were introduced: classes, inheritance, constructors and destructors. The IDE was already augmented with an object browser interface showing relations between objects and methods and allowing programmers to navigate the modules easily. Borland called its language Object Pascal, which was greatly extended to become the language underlying Delphi (which has two separate OOP systems). The name "Object Pascal" originated with the Pascal extensions developed by Apple Computer to program its Lisa and Macintosh computers. Pascal originator Niklaus Wirth consulted in developing these extensions, which built upon the record type already present in Pascal.

=== Issue with CRT unit on fast processors ===
Several versions of Turbo Pascal, including the last version 7, include a unit named CRT, which was used by many fullscreen text-mode applications on a CRT. This unit contains code in its initialization section to determine the CPU speed and calibrate delay loops. This code fails on processors with a speed greater than about 200 MHz and aborts immediately with a "Runtime Error 200" message (the error code 200 was not related to the CPU speed 200 MHz). This is caused because a loop runs to count the number of times it can iterate in a fixed time, as measured by the real-time clock. When Turbo Pascal was developed it ran on machines with CPUs running at 2.5 to 8 MHz, and little thought was given to the possibility of vastly higher speeds, so from about 200 MHz enough iterations can be run to overflow the 16-bit counter. A patch was produced when machines became too fast for the original method, but failed as processor speeds increased yet further, and was superseded by others.

Programs subject to this error can be recompiled from source code with a compiler patched to eliminate the error (using a TURBO.TPL compiled with a corrected CRT unit) or, if source code is unavailable, executables can be patched by a tool named TPPATCH or equivalent, or by loading a terminate-and-stay-resident program before running the faulty program.

There are also patches to the TP7 compiler, thus if the Pascal source is available, a new compiling's code will work without the compiled code needing a patch. If the source code is available, porting to libraries without CPU clock speed dependency is a solution too.

=== Floating-point arithmetic ===
There were several floating-point types, including single (the 4-byte [IEEE 754] representation) double (the 8-byte IEEE 754 representation), extended (a 10-byte IEEE 754 representation used mostly internally by numeric coprocessors) and Real (a 6-byte representation).

In the early days, Real was the most popular. Most PCs of the era did not have a floating-point coprocessor so all floating-point arithmetic had to be done in software. Borland's own floating-point algorithms on Real were quicker than using the other types, though its library also emulated the other types in software.

== Versions ==
=== CP/M and DOS versions ===
==== Version 1 ====
Turbo Pascal 3.0 manual front cover

Version 1, released on 20 November 1983, was a basic all-in-one system, working in memory and producing .COM executable files for DOS and CP/M, and equivalent .CMD executables for CP/M-86 (different from .CMD batch files later used in 32-bit Microsoft Windows). Source code files were limited to 64 KB to simplify the IDE, and DOS .COM files were limited to 64 KB each of code, stack and global (static) variables. Program source code could be extended by using the include facility if the source code exceeded the memory limit of the editor.

There were different versions of Turbo Pascal for computers running DOS, CP/M, or CP/M-86 with 64 KB of memory and at least one floppy disk drive. The CP/M version could run on the many CP/M machines of the time with Z80 processors, or an Apple II with Z80 card. The DOS and CP/M-86 versions ran on the many 8086 and 8088 machines which became available, including the IBM PC. The installer, lister, and compiler with its IDE, and the source code for a simple spreadsheet program called MicroCalc written by Philippe Kahn as a demonstration, would fit on a single floppy disc. A disc copy without MicroCalc would accommodate the source code and compiled executable of a reasonable-sized program—as it was common at the time for users to have only a single floppy drive as mass storage, it was a great convenience to be able to fit both the compiler and the program being written on a single disc, avoiding endless disc swapping.

The architecture of the various machines running MS-DOS additionally limited the maximum user memory to under 1 MB (e.g., machines hardware-compatible with the IBM PC were limited to 640 KB).

The Turbo Pascal IDE was advanced for its day. It was able to perform well and compile quickly with the amount of RAM on a typical home computer. The IDE was simple and intuitive to use, and had a well-organized system of menus. Early versions of the editor used WordStar key functions, which was the de facto standard at the time. Later versions of the IDE, designed for PCs with more disk space and memory, could display the definitions of the keywords of the language by putting the cursor over a keyword and pressing the F1 key (conventionally used to display help). Many definitions included example code.

In addition to standard executable programs, the compiler could generate terminate-and-stay-resident (TSR) programs, small utilities that stayed in memory and let the computer do other tasks—running several programs at the same time, multitasking, was not otherwise available. Borland produced a small application suite called Sidekick that was a TSR letting the user keep a diary, notes, and so forth.

==== Version 2 ====
Version 2, released a few months later on 17 April 1984, was an incremental improvement to the original Turbo Pascal, to the point that the reference manual was at first identical to version 1's, down to having 1983 as the copyright date on some of the compiler's sample output, but had a separate "Addendum to Reference Manual: Version 2.0 and 8087 Supplement" manual with separate page numbering. Additions included an overlay system, where separate overlay procedures would be automatically swapped from disk into a reserved space in memory. This memory was part of the 64kB RAM used by the program's code, and was automatically the size of the largest overlay procedure. Overlay procedures could include overlay sections themselves, but unless a RAM disk was used, the resulting disk swapping could be slow. 2.0 also added the Dispose procedure to manage the heap, allowing individual dynamic variables to be freed, as an alternative to the more primitive 'Mark/Release' system and increased compatibility with WordStar commands plus use of the numeric keypad on the IBM PC and compatibles. Such PCs also had new text window and CGA graphics mode commands as well as being able to use the PC's speaker for tones. Finally, DOS and CP/M-86 machines with an 8087 maths coprocessor (or later compatible) had an alternative TURBO-87 compiler available to purchase. It supported the 8087's long real data types with a range of 1.67E-307 to 1.67E+308 to 14 significant figure precision but with a much greater processing speed. The manual notes that although source code for the Turbo Pascal's software real data types offering a range of 1E-63 to 1E+63 to 11 significant figures, these were incompatible at a binary level: as well as having a much larger range, the software reals took six bytes in memory and the 8087 ones were eight.

Version 2 for CP/M-80 only runs on Z80-based CP/M machines.

==== Version 3 ====
Version 3 was released on 17 September 1986. Turbo Pascal 3 supported turtle graphics. In addition to the default software real numbers and 8087 edition of the compiler, Borland also offered a binary-coded decimal (BCD) version (TURBOBCD) which offered the same numeric range as real data types but to 18 significant figures.

=== DOS versions ===
==== Version 4 ====
Released on 20 November 1987, Version 4 was a total rewrite, with both look and feel and internal operation much changed. The compiler generated executables in .EXE format under DOS, rather than the simpler but more restricted .COM executables. The by-then obsolete CP/M and CP/M-86 operating system versions were dropped when Turbo Pascal was rewritten. Version 4 introduced units, and a full-screen text user interface with pull-down menus; earlier versions had a text-based menu screen and a separate full-screen editor. (Microsoft Windows was still very experimental when the first version was released, and even mice were rare.) An add-on package, the Turbo Pascal Graphix Toolbox, was available for Turbo Pascal V4.

==== Version 5.0 ====
Colour displays were replacing monochrome; Turbo Pascal version 5.0, released 24 August 1988, introduced blue as the editor's default background color, used by Borland's DOS compilers until the end of this product line in the mid-1990s. It also added debugger support for breakpoints and watches.

==== Version 5.5 ====
This version, released on 2 May 1989, introduced object-oriented programming features for the Pascal language, including concept of classes, static and dynamic objects, constructors and destructors and inheritance, which would become the basis for the Object Pascal found in Borland Delphi. The IDE uses the default blue colour scheme that would also be used on later Borland Turbo products. Other changes to IDE include the addition of context-sensitive help with description of all built-in functions, and the ability to copy code fragments from the help to edit window.

==== Version 6.0 ====
Version 6 was released on 23 October 1990. Changes from 5.5 include: the addition of inline assembly, the addition of the Turbo Vision library, mouse support, clipboard for text manipulations, multiple document interface supporting up to nine edit windows.

==== Version 7.0 ====
Version 7 was released on 27 October 1992. Changes from 6.0 include support for the creation of DOS and Windows executables and Windows DLLs, and syntax highlighting. For version 7 Borland released a professional version of Turbo Pascal, named Borland Pascal. 7.01 was the only bugfix release, and the last release of Turbo Pascal for DOS.

=== Turbo Pascal for Windows ===
Two versions named "Turbo Pascal for Windows" (TPW), for Windows 3.x, were released: TPW 1.0, based on Turbo Pascal 6 but released about 2 years later, and 1.5, released after Turbo Pascal 7; they were succeeded by Borland Pascal 7, which had Windows support. The Windows compiler in Pascal 7 was titled Borland Pascal for Windows.

Both versions built Windows-compatible programs, and featured a Windows-based IDE, as opposed to the DOS-based IDE in Turbo Pascal. The IDE and editor commands conformed to the Microsoft Windows user interface guidelines instead of the classic TP user interface. The support for Windows programs required the Object Windows Library (OWL), similar but not identical to that for the first release of Borland C++, and radically different from the earlier DOS Turbo Vision environment. Turbo Pascal was superseded for the Windows platform by Delphi; the Delphi compiler can produce console programs and graphical user interface (GUI) applications, so that using Turbo and Borland Pascal became unnecessary.

=== Turbo Pascal for Macintosh ===
Borland released Turbo Pascal for Macintosh in 1986. Much like versions 1 to 3 for other operating systems, it was written in compact assembly language and had a very powerful IDE, but no good debugger. Borland did not support this product very well, although they issued a version 1.1, patched to run on the 32-bit Macintosh II. Macintosh support was dropped soon after.

=== Freeware releases ===
Borland released several versions of Turbo Pascal as freeware after they became "antique software", with 1.0 for DOS on 1 February 2000, 3.02 on 10 February 2000, 5.5 on 21 February 2002, Turbo Pascal 7.01 French version in year 2000. Most of the downloads are still available on the successor website of Embarcadero Technologies.

== See also ==
- Borland Graphics Interface
- Free Pascal
