= Adam Bosworth =

American businessman

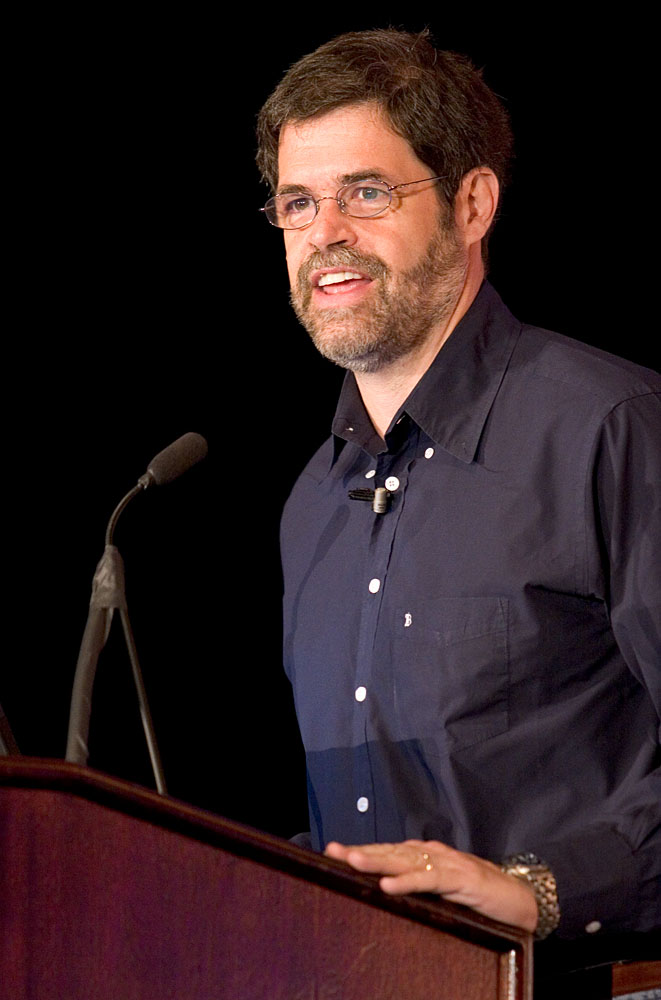
Adam Bosworth at the MySQL Users Conference 2005.

Adam Bosworth is a former Vice President of Product Management at Google Inc. from 2004 to 2007; prior to that, he was senior VP Engineering and Chief Software Architect at BEA Systems responsible for the engineering efforts for BEA's Framework Division. Bosworth had co-founded Crossgain, a software development firm acquired by BEA in 2001. Crossgain's "Cajun" project developed into BEA's WebLogic Workshop product. At BEA, Bosworth also developed the Alchemy intelligent caching framework in a team consisting of Bosworth and his son, Alex. Alchemy was a software layer used by Internet Explorer to communicate with a corresponding software layer on the web server allowing both upload and download data to be cached when the browser was disconnected from the network. Architecturally, this approach is similar to the design of the Google Web Accelerator although that product only performs server-side caching, rather than client-side caching.

Known as one of the pioneers of XML technology, Bosworth previously held various senior management positions at Microsoft, including General Manager of the WebData group, a team focused on defining and driving XML strategy. While at Microsoft, he was responsible for designing and delivering the Microsoft Access PC database product (codenamed 'Cirrus') and assembling and driving the team that developed Internet Explorer 4.0's HTML engine (codenamed 'Trident').

Prior to Microsoft, Bosworth worked for Borland where he developed the Quattro spreadsheet application following Borland's acquisition of Analytica in 1985 - founded by Bosworth and Eric Michelman, and managed by Brad Silverberg.

Bosworth graduated from St. Ann's School in Brooklyn Heights, which was founded by his father, Stanley Bosworth, and received his bachelor's degree in History from Harvard University in 1976.

At Google, Bosworth was heading a division known as Google Health, and reports suggested that he was operating under the title of "Architect" of the project at that time.

While the reasons for his departure from Google were not immediately clear, according to a post on his blog, Bosworth left Google to start a new company called Keas, Keas.

Adam joined Salesforce in 2013 as Executive Vice President to drive the company next generation application development platform. Adam is one of Marc Benioff's closest technical advisors, a relationship that goes back to the very early days of Salesforce.com.

On August 3, 2016, it was announced that Adam was leaving Salesforce for a position at Amazon.

At AWS, Adam built and led the team responsible for developing Honeycode which was first released on June 24, 2020. Honeycode unifies collaborative spreadsheets with a relational data model to enable users to build rich user interfaces and business workflow using existing spreadsheet knowledge.
