= Dale Fuller =

Dale Fuller may refer to:

- Dale Fuller (businessman)
- Dale Fuller (actress)
