= ObjectView =

Server-based Internet software suite

ObjectView is a software suite published by Cypress Logic that provides access to and the option to create web services. It is designed to run on web servers and supports Microsoft.net and Apache, supports most database software, and deals with XML requests.

In the 1990s ObjectView was a Windows client-server development tool for database access from Matesys like Borland's ObjectVision, Gupta Technologies's SQLWindows, and Powersoft's PowerBuilder. It was bought by KnowledgeWare in 1993. In 1994 Knowledgeware released ObjectView Desktop, a scaled-down version.
