= Tim Berry =

Tim Berry may refer to:

- Tim Berry (politician) (born 1961), American politician in Indiana
- Tim Berry (entrepreneur) (born 1948), American entrepreneur and author
