= JRT Pascal =

Pascal programming language implementation

JRT Pascal (Jim Russell Tyson) is an implementation of the Pascal programming language. It was available in the early 1980s on the CP/M operating system.

== History ==
At the end of the 1970s, the most popular Pascal implementation for microcomputers was UCSD Pascal, which many people considered overpriced at hundreds of dollars. The original basis for UCSD Pascal was the p-machine compiler from ETH Zurich, the originators of Pascal. JRT was a Pascal interpreter by Jim Russell Tyson that compiled to its own pseudocode separate from UCSD Pascal p-code.

In the early 1980s various organizations developed compilers for UCSD Pascal on microcomputers. UCSD's developers announced that they were working on a native compiler that would essentially convert UCSD from an interpreter to a compiled, native system in one step. JRT was able to get considerable attention for several months by being a much cheaper alternative to UCSD Pascal. This lasted less than a year, as Borland began selling Turbo Pascal. However, JRT was very important in that it established a low price precedent (less than $100) for a Pascal implementation.

JRT advertisements promised "a complete CP/M Pascal for only $29.95!", stating that "this is the same system we sold for $295!". After receiving too many orders for it to fill—Jerry Pournelle reported in BYTE that Sarah Smith had not received the software eight months after ordering—JRT Systems filed for Chapter 11 bankruptcy on 18 November 1983. The product eventually continued through a version 4 priced at $69.95 and along with a Modula-2 at $99.95 may have been successful had not Turbo Pascal shown up for about the same price. Turbo Pascal was a true compiler with an IDE as well as a business model that allowed it to meet customer demand. JRT was said to have later been sold under the name "Nevada Pascal" by Ellis Computing.

== Reception ==
Pournelle in May 1983 reported that JRT Pascal 2.0 was "intentionally a nonportable dialect", criticized its error handling, and advised beginners with the language to "stay away from it". BYTE editors in April 1983 and January 1984 reported receiving many complaints from readers on slow delivery of JRT Pascal. Pournelle in January 1984 called version 3.0 "a bargain at $29.95. Qualifications: it's a bargain in comparison to a lot of stuff on the market, and its value depends in good part on what you intend to do with it". He reported that 3.0 "has fixed most—not all, but most—of the bugs that plagued the earlier versions", and that "it's cheap for the compiler alone, and you get a bunch of useful utilities with it". Pournelle warned, however, of its "nonstandard features" and that based on Smith's experience and "lots of letters from readers who ordered JRT Pascal and received nothing ... for months", "you must then be prepared to wait" for delivery. Because of JRT, Borland at first had difficulty in persuading customers that it was shipping Turbo Pascal. Bruce F. Webster in August 1985 described JRT Pascal in the magazine as a "fiasco". Jeff Duntemann stated in PC Magazine in 1984 that JRT Pascal "was a terrible compiler. Besides doing great harm to the Pascal language definition, it was a bug farm, locking up my CP/M-80 computer several times an evening. Not surprisingly, JRT Systems went bankrupt late last year".
