= Microsoft Pascal =

Implementation of Pascal programming language

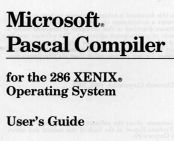
- Microsoft Pascal Compiler for the 286 XENIX Operating System User's Guide, part number 8511I-330-05, document number 020-092-013, from 1985.
- Original author: Microsoft Corporation
- Initial release: 1980; 45 years ago
- Stable release: 4.0 / 1988; 37 years ago
- Operating system: MS-DOS, Xenix, OS/2
- Type: Pascal programming language
- License: Commercial

Microsoft Pascal is a discontinued implementation of the Pascal programming language developed by the Microsoft Corporation for compiling programs for running on its MS-DOS and Xenix operating systems and, in later versions, on OS/2 (like many other Microsoft programming tools, albeit they are only capable of generating 16-bit programs for the latter).

== Overview ==
Microsoft Pascal version 1.0 was released in 1980. The last version of Microsoft Pascal to be released was version 4.0 in 1988, when Microsoft Pascal was superseded by Microsoft QuickPascal, a cheaper development tool that Microsoft produced in order to compete with Borland's Turbo Pascal.

Microsoft Pascal was priced at $300, whereas QuickPascal was priced between $25 and 50, and the differences between the two were similar to those between Microsoft BASIC Professional Development System and Microsoft QuickBASIC.

Unlike the ISO-compliant Microsoft Pascal product, QuickPascal was compatibile with Turbo Pascal. This included not only source-level compatibility, but rather complete binary compatibility with widely available unit libraries for the competitor's compiler. To achieve this level of compatibility, QuickPascal moved away from the common file format (OBJ) and tool set (LINK, LIB) shared by Microsoft's other compilers.
