= Open Environment Corporation =

Open Environment Corporation (OEC)
- Industry: Technology, Outsourcing Services, Business Consulting
- Founded: 1992
- Headquarters: Cambridge, MA, USA
- Website: www.borland.com

Open Environment Corporation (OEC) was founded by John J. Donovan in 1992 in Cambridge, Massachusetts, USA. OEC develops that enables companies to create applications for distributed, client/server computing systems. OEC pioneered a three-tiered software architecture that allows customer to rapidly develop, deploy and manage software applications to access critical information quickly on an enterprise-wide basis.

== History ==
In 1992, Open Environment Corporation was founded in Cambridge, Massachusetts (USA) by John J. Donovan, former chairman. It was initially founded as a division of Cambridge Technology Group, and then spun-out in 1992.

On February 10, 1995, OEC completed its initial public offering on NASDAQ under ticker OPEN.

On August 31, 1995, OEC bought Jarrah Technologies Pty. Limited in a stock-swap.

In 1996 OEC was bought out by Borland.

== Products ==
OEC Toolkit is a set of client/server application development software. OEC sold and marketed this product jointly with IBM. The product, which eventually would become known as Entera, and was the first middleware product sold as a best-of-breed application server platform.
