= Del Yocam =

American businessman

- Born: December 24, 1943 (age 82)
- Education: California State University, Fullerton (BA); California State University, Long Beach (MBA)
- Occupations: Chairman and CEO of Borland

Delbert W. Yocam (born December 24, 1943) is an American businessman who held key positions at Borland, Tektronix, and Apple. At Apple, during the 1980s, Yocam ran the Apple II group and later became Apple's first chief operating officer (COO). He served on the board of directors at Adobe Systems.

== Education ==
Yocam has a master's degree in business administration and a bachelor's degree from California State University and was honored as a "distinguished alumnus" in 1988 and 1999. He completed Directors' College at Stanford Law School in 1996 and 2003, and also at the University of Delaware in 2005. Yocam also completed Harvard's Executive Education program "Making Corporate Boards More Effective" at Harvard Business School in 2005.

== Career ==
Yocam started his business career with management positions at the Ford Motor Company in the 1960s and moved into technology in the 1970s. Prior to his ten years at Apple Computer, Inc., Yocam held positions with Control Data Corp., Computer Automation, Inc., and the Fairchild Camera and Instrument Corp.

He joined Apple Computer in 1979 as vice president of manufacturing and operations. He was the executive vice president and general manager of the Apple II group from 1983 until 1985. From 1986 until 1988, he served as executive vice president and Apple's first chief operating officer (COO). After three years as COO, Yocam became president of Apple Pacific. In this position, Yocam was responsible for strengthening Apple's markets in Canada, Australia, and Japan, while investing in emerging markets in the Far East and Latin America. He retired from Apple on his tenth anniversary in 1989.

Yocam was president, chief operating officer (COO), and a board director of Tektronix, Inc. He joined the Beaverton, Oregon, manufacturer of test and measurement equipment, computer graphics products, and television systems in 1992. He is credited with turning around the company, providing eight consecutive quarters of improved core operating income and with refocusing the company's research and development spending, so that more than 50 percent of revenues came from new products, compared with 22 percent in 1991. He was originally tapped to replace the CEO, Jerry Meyer, on Meyer's retirement, but when Meyer put those plans on hold, Yocam quit. His three-year contract was completed in 1995.

Yocam was chairman and CEO of Borland International, Inc., Scotts Valley, California, a provider of software and services from 1996 through 1999. He resigned after the acquisition of Visigenics Software was completed in 1999 and the company posted a $10.5 million loss for the 3rd quarter.

== Board positions ==
Yocam served on the board of directors of Adobe Systems Inc. (1991–2009), Oracle Corp. (1992–1997), Xircom, Inc. (1996–2001) (acquired by Intel Corp. in 2001), Raster Graphics, Inc. (1995–1999), Hollywood Park, Inc. (1997–1998), Boomtown, Inc. (1995–1997) (acquired by Hollywood Park, Inc. in 1997), Integrated Measurement Systems, Inc. (1995–1997), Sapiens International Corp. (1995–1997), and AST Research, Inc. (1992–1995).

Yocam also served on the board of directors of The Tech Museum of Innovation (1987–1990, Vice Chairman 1989–1990) on the national board of directors of the American Electronics Association (1989), and on the special advisory council to the Office of Technology Assessment of the United States Congress (1986–1988).
