= Silk Central =

- Original author: Borland
- Developer: OpenText
- Release: 2005
- Stable release: 21.0 / Nov 2020
- Operating system: Windows Server 2012, Windows Server 2012 R2, Windows Server 2016, Windows Server 2019, Windows 8.1, Windows 10, Android, iOS, Linux
- Available in: English, Japanese, German, French, Simplified Chinese, Portuguese
- Type: Test Management
- License: Commercial proprietary software
- Website: www.microfocus.com/en-us/products/silk-central/overview

Silk Central is a test management software product developed by OpenText that is marketed to improve productivity, traceability, and visibility for all types of software testing. Silk Central Test Manager is an open software test management product that supports both responsive and traditional development projects.
