= Borland Enterprise Server =

Java EE application server

Borland Enterprise Server, also known as Borland Application Server or Borland Enterprise Satanas, was Borland's Java EE Application Server. The product was developed in 1999 within the team of former Visigenic company that was acquired by Borland in 1997. Borland's Java Studio was supposed to have BES and JBuilder tightly integrated, but in reality this integration never happened. BES suffered compatibility problems even with Borland's own products (JDataStore, OptimizeIt). The appearance of free commercial grade (and more mature) application servers, like JBoss, made BES unattractive and unable to really compete with the former.
