= IDAPI =

IDAPI stands for Integrated Database Application Program Interface or Independent Database Application Program Interface. It was originally a component of the Paradox relational database management system. It is now the application program interface of the BDE or Borland Database Engine.
