= Borland C++ =

C++ IDE

- Developer: Borland
- Stable release: 5.5 / February 16, 2000; 26 years ago
- Operating system: MS-DOS, OS/2, Microsoft Windows
- Type: IDE
- License: Proprietary software

Borland C++ was a C and C++ IDE (integrated development environment) released by Borland for MS-DOS and Microsoft Windows. It was the successor to Turbo C++ and included a better debugger, the Turbo Debugger, which was written in protected-mode DOS.

== Libraries ==
Object Windows Library (OWL): A set of C++ classes to make it easier to develop professional graphical Windows applications.

Turbo Vision: A set of C++ classes to create professional applications in DOS. Those classes mimics some of the aspects of a Windows application like: dialog boxes, messages pumps, menus, accelerators, etc.

Borland Graphics Interface: A library of functions for doing simple, presentation-style 2D graphics. Drivers were included for generic CGA, EGA and VGA capability, with support for a limited number of video-modes, but more advanced, third-party drivers were also available.

== Add-ons ==
Borland Power Pack for DOS: Used to create 16- and 32-bit protected mode DOS applications, which can access a limited scope of the Windows API and call functions in any Windows DLL.

Borland Code Guard: Once installed and integrated within the IDE, Code Guard can insert instrumentation code in the final executable that can be used to monitor: pointer usage, API calls, how many times some function is called, and other features. If some error is found, a pop-up window appears, the debugger can stop, or a log is written to disk. Delivered for 16- and 32-bit applications.

== Version history ==
=== Borland C++ for MS-DOS, Windows ===
- 2.0 (1991; MS-DOS)
- 3.0 (1991): New compiler support to build Microsoft Windows applications.
- 3.1 (1992): Introduction of Windows-based IDE and application frameworks (OWL 1.0, Turbovision 1.0)
- 4.0 (1993; Windows 3.x): MS-DOS IDE supported no longer, included OWL 2.0.
- 4.01
- 4.02 (1994)
- 4.5
- 4.51
- 4.52 (1995): Official support for Windows 95, OWL 2.5. Last version
- 4.53
- 5.0 (1996-03-26(base, Development Suite), 1996-06-25(Design Tools); Windows 3.x/95/NT 3.51): Basic version includes Borland C++ 4.52, ObjectWindows Library (OWL) 5.0, Sun's Java Development Kit, Borland Debugger for Java, native 32-bit ObjectScripting IDE, Visual Database Tools (VDBT). Development suite also includes CodeGuard 32/16, PVCS Version Manager, InstallShield Express, and AppAccelerator Just-in-Time for Java compiler. Development Suite with Design Tools version adds Scenario View Editor, Scenario View Editor, Object Model Editor to Development Suite edition. Supports compilation of Windows 3.1/95/NT 3.51 and DOS native executables, with Windows 3.1 integrated development environment supported via BC++ 4.52. It does not (officially) work on Windows NT 4.0 (which was still in development at that time). 3rd party tests exhibited some problems on NT 4.0. C++ compiler can support ObjectWindows Library (OWL) 5.0, Microsoft Foundation Classes 3.2/4.0 libraries. Note that even in this version, the "huge" memory model DOS target of the compiler does not generate the required code to manipulate huge pointers - you instead need to declare every pointer as "char huge *" etc. - unlike both Microsoft and Watcom compilers.
- 5.01 (1996-09-03(base, Development Suite, Design Tools)): Base version now includes ViewSoft's Power Charger for MFC demo, Borland Delphi 2.0 Trial Edition, DeltaPoint's QuickSite automatic web page creation and site management tool; with ObjectWindows Library (OWL) updated to 5.01. Design Tools edition includes Together/C++ object-oriented analysis and design tools (OOAD) over Development Suite edition.
- 5.02 (1997-04-04): Final independent release of the Borland C++ IDE (subsequently replaced up by the C++Builder series), final release to support compilation to (real-mode) MS-DOS target. New features include Windows NT 4.0 operating system support, MFC 4.1 library support, code signing. All versions include full OWL and MFC source codes. Corresponding to Borland C++Builder 3, the CD version of Borland C++ is free by mailing the in-box coupon from C++Builder 3 Professional package. Registered Borland C++ 5 owners can receive update for discount.

==== Borland C++ Compiler ====
- 5.5 (2000-02-16; Windows 95/98/NT/2000): Based on Borland C++Builder 5, it is a freeware compiler without the IDE from the parent product. Includes Borland C++ Compiler v5.5, Borland Turbo Incremental Linker, Borland Resource Compiler / Binder, C++ Win32 Preprocessor, ANSI/OEM character set file conversion utility, Import Definitions utility to provide information about DLLs, Import Library utility to create import libraries from DLLs, Borland Turbo Dump, Librarian, Borland C/C++ Runtime Library, ANSI/ISO Standard Template Library (STL).

==== C++Builder with C++ bundle ====
- Borland C++ Builder 4.0 + Borland C++ 5.02 (1999): Bundle combination to facilitate the migration to C++Builder.

=== Borland C++ for OS/2 ===
- Borland C++ 1.0 (1992)
- Borland C++ 1.5 (1992)
- Borland C++ 2.0 (1995-01-09 (base), 1995-06-01 (SMART toolset)): Supports OS/2 2.1 and Warp 3, OWL for Presentation Manager 2.0 library. SMART toolset edition includes Source Migration Analysis Reporting Toolset (SMART) developed by One Up Corporation for automatic migration of 16/32-bit Windows and 16-bit OS/2 codes to 32-bit OS/2.

=== Borland C++ (Builder) Mobile Edition ===
Designed to be integrated with Borland C++Builder 6, initial release was to be released in late November 2002, and bundled with Borland C++Builder 6 Enterprise and Professional editions.

On April 29, 2003, Borland Software Corporation announced the release of Borland C++ Mobile Edition for Series 60, Nokia Edition. It includes a version of Borland C++Builder 6, Series 60 Software Development Kit (SDK) for Symbian OS, Nokia Edition (includes Nokia Series 60 emulator), C++ Mobile Edition plug-in.

C++ Mobile Edition is also available as a separate plug-in for C++Builder 6, supporting all except Trial Editions.

== Evolution of Borland C++ ==
Borland C++ evolved in a number of steps:

Turbo C++ → Borland C++ → Borland C++Builder → CodeGear C++Builder → Embarcadero C++Builder

== See also ==
- Turbo C
- Turbo C++
- Visual C++
- C++Builder
