= Visibroker =

Object request broker

Rocket Visibroker
- Original authors: Visigenic, Borland
- Developer: Rocket Software
- Stable release: 8.5 / March 2011
- Available in: Multilingual
- Type: Middleware
- License: Proprietary

VisiBroker is an object request broker (ORB) from Rocket Software (formerly from OpenText, Micro Focus, Borland, and Visigenic) that fully supports the CORBA standard. VisiBroker for Java is written in Java and can run in any Java environment. VisiBroker for C++ provides ANSI C++ interfaces for maximum source portability. VisiBroker offers features such as support for the C++ programming language, object naming, the ability to distribute objects across a network, support for persistent objects, dynamic object creation and interoperability with other ORB implementations.
