= Borland Reflex =

DOS flat-file database management system

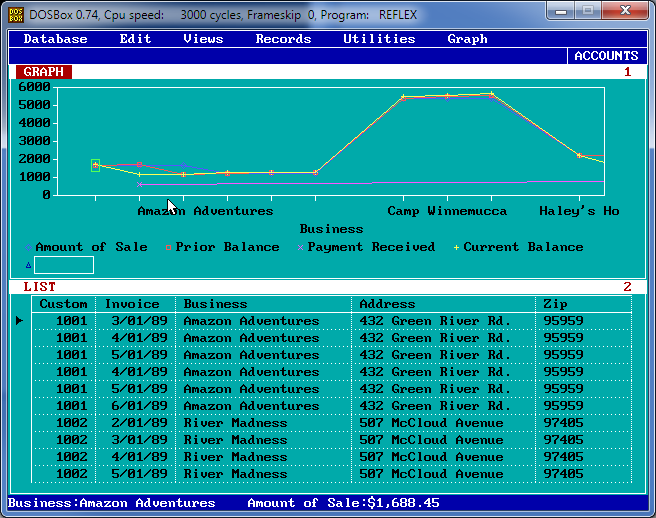
Reflex was very advanced for its time

Borland Reflex is a flat-file database management system for DOS. It was the first commercial PC database to use the mouse and graphics mode, and drag-and-drop capability in the report formatting module. Reflex was originally developed by Analytica Corporation.

The engineering team of Analytica, managed by Brad Silverberg and including Reflex co-founder Adam Bosworth became the core of Borland's engineering team in the U.S. Brad Silverberg was vice-president of engineering until he left in early 1990 to head up the Personal Systems division at Microsoft. Adam Bosworth initiated and headed up the Quattro project until moving to Microsoft later in 1990 to take over the project which eventually became Access. Another Reflex developer, Ken Day, later moved to Macromedia where he worked on Shockwave, among other projects.

Reflex still runs on any modern (2003) Windows-based PC.

Gordon Bell, a senior researcher in Microsoft's Media Presence Research Group, includes a case study on Analytica in his book High-Tech Ventures: The Guide For Entrepreneurial Success.
