= JBuilder =

Discontinued integrated development environment

- Screenshot JBuilder 2005 Screenshot
- Developer: CodeGear
- Release: 1997
- Final release: 2008 R2 / April 23, 2009; 17 years ago
- Written in: Java
- Operating system: Cross-platform
- Type: Integrated development environment
- License: Proprietary
- Website: www.embarcadero.com/products/jbuilder

JBuilder is a discontinued integrated development environment (IDE) for the programming language Java from Embarcadero Technologies. Originally developed by Borland, JBuilder was spun off with CodeGear which was eventually purchased by Embarcadero Technologies in 2008.

Oracle had based the first versions of JDeveloper on code from JBuilder licensed from Borland, but it has since been rewritten from scratch.

== Versions ==
| Name | Year | Editions |
|---|---|---|
| JBuilder 1 | 1997 | Client/Server, Professional, Standard; With host OS support for Windows only |
| JBuilder 2 | 1998 | Client/Server, Professional, Standard |
| JBuilder 3 | 1999 | Enterprise, Professional, Standard; Enterprise - Solaris Edition and Foundation which are PrimeTime based were added later |
| JBuilder 3.5 | 1999 | Enterprise, Professional, Foundation; Introducing 100%-Java PrimeTime core IDE available on Linux, Solaris and Windows |
| JBuilder 4 | 2000 | Enterprise, Professional, Foundation |
| JBuilder 5 | 2001 | Enterprise, Standard, Personal |
| JBuilder 6 | 2001 | Enterprise, Standard, Personal |
| JBuilder 7 | 2002 | Enterprise, Standard, Personal; Updated to at least Update 3; Official host OS support for Mac OS X |
| JBuilder 8 | 2002 | Enterprise, Standard, Personal; Updated to at least Update 1 |
| JBuilder 9 | 2003 | Enterprise, Standard, Personal; Updated to at least Update 2 |
| JBuilder X | 2003 | Enterprise, Developer, Foundation; Updated to at least Update 3 |
| JBuilder 2005 | 2004 | Enterprise, Developer, Foundation; Updated to at least Update 4 |
| JBuilder 2006 | 2005 | Enterprise, Developer, Foundation; Updated to at least Service Pack 3 with JDK6 support |
| Borland JBuilder 2007 | 2006 | Enterprise, Professional, Developer, Turbo; eclipse 3.2 based; Released by Borland; The first release built upon eclipse; Available only on Windows as the host OS; A licensed copy of JBuilder 2006 (2006 Enterprise for 2007 Enterprise, 2006 Developer for 2007 Professional) with Service Pack 4 which cannot be obtained anywhere else is included |
| CodeGear JBuilder 2007 R2 | 2007 | Enterprise Borland ALM Edition, Enterprise, Standard, Turbo; eclipse 3.2 based; Released by CodeGear; Addition of host OS support for Linux and Mac OS X; A licensed copy of JBuilder 2006 (2006 Enterprise for 2007 Enterprise Borland ALM Edition and 2007 Enterprise, 2006 Developer for 2007 Standard) with Service Pack 4 which cannot be obtained anywhere else is included |
| CodeGear JBuilder 2008 | 2008 | Enterprise, Professional, Turbo; eclipse 3.3 based; Released by CodeGear; Updated to Update 2 |
| CodeGear JBuilder 2008 R2 | 2009 | Enterprise, Professional, Turbo; eclipse 3.4 based; Released by Embarcadero |

JBuilder 1 through 3 are based on the Delphi IDE. JBuilder 3.5 through 2006 are based on PrimeTime, an all-Java IDE framework. JBuilder 2007 "Peloton" is the first JBuilder release based on the eclipse IDE framework.

== See also ==
- Comparison of integrated development environments
