= ObjectVision =

Forms-based programming language

- Developer: Borland
- Stable release: 1992
- Operating system: Windows
- Type: Programming language
- License: Proprietary

ObjectVision was a forms-based programming language and environment for Windows 3.x developed by Borland. The latest version, 2.1, was released in 1992.

An ObjectVision application is composed by forms designed in a graphic way that contains objects and events to provide interactivity. Forms are connected together with logic in the form of decision trees. ObjectVision applications also can interact with databases using multiple engines, like Paradox and dBase. A finished project is saved as an OVD file, that is executed by an interpreted runtime that can be freely distributed.

ObjectVision was not used broadly except in some niche segments, but the visual programming ideas were the basis for Borland Delphi.
