= Dale Fuller (businessman) =

Software executive

- Education: Stanford University – Advanced Management College (Executive Certificate, 1994); Pacific College (B.Sc. Computer Science, 1980)
- Occupations: Software executive; Entrepreneur; Software developer
- Years active: c. 1980s – present
- Employer(s): MokaFive, Inc. (former)
- Known for: Former CEO of Borland Software Corporation; leadership roles at Apple (PowerBook division); interim CEO of McAfee
- Board member of: ComScore; Symantec; Prosites, Inc.; MobiSocial
- Awards: Honorary doctorate, St. Petersburg State University

Dale Fuller is one of Silicon Valley’s first-generation software executives, entrepreneurs and developers. He took WhoWhere? Inc. public, led Apple’s PowerBook division to profitability and was chief executive officer and president of Borland Software Corporation. Fuller is chairman, and was president and chief executive officer at MokaFive Inc.

== Career ==
During his early career, Fuller worked for Canon, Motorola, Texas Instruments and NEC Technologies Inc. From 1987 to 1991, he worked in the business development group at Apple.

From 1994 to 1996, Fuller was vice president and general manager for Portable Computer Systems of NEC, moving NEC's notebook computers into the top tier of portable systems and manufacturers. During his time there, he extended the company’s leadership in marketplace development and deployment.

In 1996, Fuller returned to Apple as vice president and general manager of the company’s PowerBook division. He restructured and returned the troubled PowerBook division to profitability.

In 1997 Fuller helped grow WhoWhere.com, angelfire.com, and Mailcity, which was purchased by Lycos in 1998. In 1999, Fuller was interim president and CEO of Borland Software Corporation, also known as Inprise. The position became permanent in 2000. Fuller was fired from Borland in 2005 following a weak quarterly performance. McAfee Inc. named Fuller interim president and CEO in January 2006. Fuller took over from George Samenuk and Kevin Weiss following an internal probe into options backdating practices from the company’s initial public offering in 1996 through 2003. Fuller held that position until July 2007.

In 2008, Fuller became MokaFive’s president and CEO.

In 2018, Fuller joined the board of directors for ComScore [SCOR] and Symantec [SYMC].

== Credentials ==
- Bachelor of Science, Computer Science, Pacific College in 1980
- Executive Certificate of Business Administration, Stanford University, Advance Management College in 1994
- Honorary doctorate, St. Petersburg State University, Russia
- Chairman, Let Them Hear Foundation
- Member, Advisory Board of Essential Solutions Inc.
- Advisory Board of SeeControl Inc.
- American Association of Artificial Intelligence
- Institute of Electrical and Electronics Engineers
- Mentor, Bootup Labs, Inc.

Former directorships

- Pacific Edge Software Inc.
- Medrium Inc.
- MailFrontier Inc.
- Guidance Software Inc.
- Krugle Inc.
- Phoenix Technologies Ltd.
- Borland Software Corporation
- Software & Industry Information Association
- McAfee Inc.,
- SeeControl Inc.
- Webgistix Inc.
- Zoran Corporation
- Moka5
- Quantum Corporation
- AVG Technologies CZ
- Soothe, Inc

Current directorships

- Prosites, Inc
- MobiSocial
- ComScore
- Symantec
