= Brad Silverberg =

American computer scientist

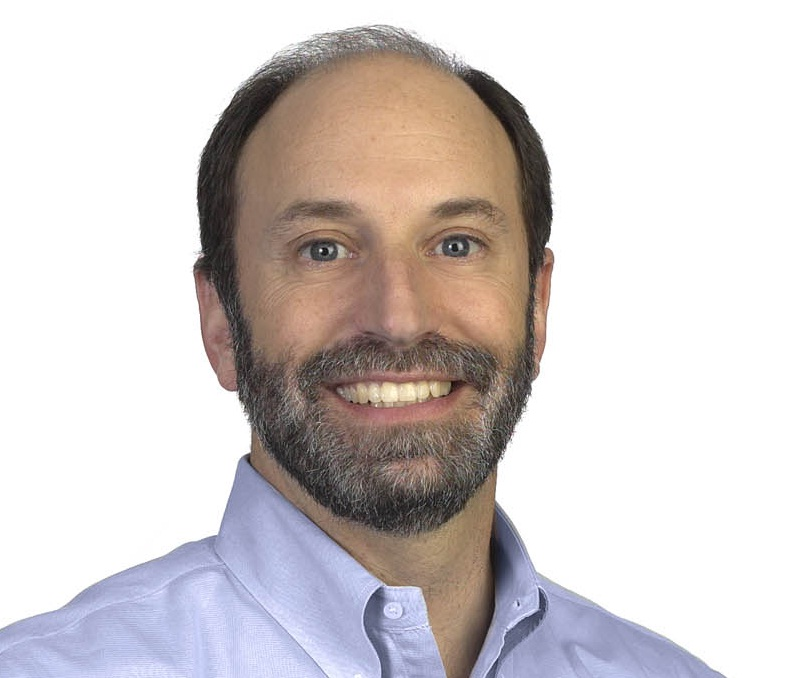
- Silverberg in 2010
- Born: March 31, 1954 (age 72); Cleveland, Ohio
- Education: Brown University (Sc.B.); University of Toronto (M.Sc.)
- Occupations: Businessman; Computer scientist; Venture capitalist
- Known for: Leading development of Windows 95 and Internet Explorer at Microsoft; Co-founder of Ignition Partners; Co-founder of Fuel Capital

Brad Silverberg is an American computer scientist and businessman, most noted for his work at Microsoft in 1990–1999 as Senior VP and product manager for MS-DOS, Windows, Internet Explorer, and Office. He was named PC Magazine's Person of the Year in 1995 for his leadership of Windows 95.

== Early career ==
Silverberg earned a BS degree magna cum laude in computer science from Brown University, and an MS in computer science from University of Toronto. His first work experience was research at SRI International, one of the four first ARPANET nodes. Also early in his career Silverberg worked in the early 1980s at Apple Computer on the failed Lisa project.

Later Silverberg was hired as the first employee at Analytica, a Silicon Valley startup. After 1985, he was VP of Engineering at Borland after their acquisition of Analytica.

== Career at Microsoft ==
In 1990, Silverberg left Borland to lead the personal systems division at Microsoft. A number of people left Borland to follow him at Microsoft in the following years, leading to a number of failed lawsuits from Borland.

At the start of his tenure, the personal systems division was already a prime moneymaker with MS-DOS, at that time sold only through OEMs. After shipping Windows 95, he turned his full-time focus onto the Internet efforts at Microsoft, which led to the creation of the Internet Platform and Tools Division 1996, which he led.

In 1997, Silverberg was given responsibilities for Office but his principal interest remained with the Internet. He took a sabbatical that summer to reflect on where the Internet was going at Microsoft. He returned as a part-time consultant for new president and later CEO, Steve Ballmer. On 29 October 1999, he left Microsoft.

== After Microsoft ==
In March 2000, he led a group of former Microsoft executives to found Ignition Partners, a venture capital firm. Silverberg worked as a partner of the firm. In 2013, he co-founded Fuel Capital, a seed stage venture capital firm. Silverberg retired in 2020.
