= Tim Berry (entrepreneur) =

American businessman (born 1948)

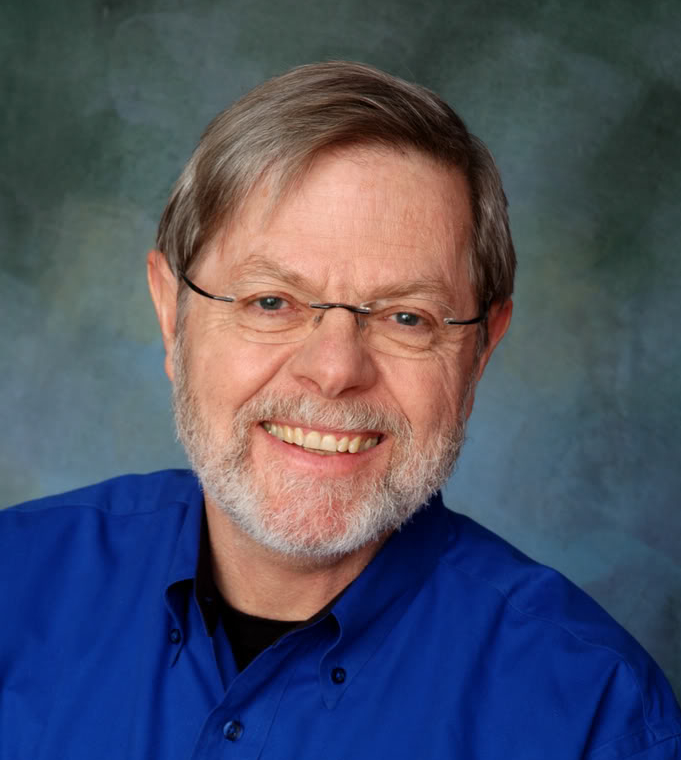
- Born: Timothy J. Berry; 1948 (age 77–78); Eugene, Oregon, United States
- Education: Stanford University (M.B.A.), 1981; University of Oregon (M.A.in Journalism), 1974; University of Notre Dame(B.A.in Literature), 1970
- Occupations: Entrepreneur, author
- Website: timberry.com

Tim Berry (born 1948) is an American entrepreneur and published business author. He is the founder and chairman of Palo Alto Software and bplans.com.

== History ==
Berry was born and raised in the U.S., but moved with his wife to Mexico City in 1971 where he worked as a wire service journalist for United Press International and then wrote for McGraw-Hill and Businessweek for five years. In 1976, betting on the devaluation of the peso, he and his wife put up $1000 and borrowed $4000 for a quarter-acre lot. After the peso lost its value in 1979, they sold the lot for $22,000 and used that money to help with as tuition at Stanford's business school. While at Stanford, Berry worked as a market research consultant for Creative Strategies International and began creating his own business planning software. He earned his MBA in 1981.

After graduating, Berry founded his own consulting practice in 1983. His clients included Apple Computer, Hewlett-Packard, Ashton-Tate, Lotus Development Corporation, and others. That same year, he met Phillippe Kahn and helped draft a business plan that led to the launch of Borland International. In 1983, Berry founded his company, then called "Infoplan"; the name was changed to Palo Alto Software in 1988. The company started out selling business plan templates, supplemented by Berry's consulting, mostly focused on doing business in Latin America. The company moved to Eugene, Oregon in 1992 and almost was bankrupt by 1994; Berry had three mortgages and $65,000 in credit card debt. In 1994, the company released the first version of its Business Plan Pro software, was created by programmers working for equity. The software-assisted users in creating business plans instead of simply providing templates, and was sold through retails stores; it became a successful product, with $2M in sales in the first year. In 1995, Berry launched BPlans.com as resource for small businesses. In 2000 the company had $5M in revenue and 35 employees, but with the crash of the dot-com bubble revenue fell and the company had to lay off five employees.

Sales recovered, and in 2010 the company had $10M in annual revenue. In that year, Berry's daughter, Sabrina Parsons, took over as CEO, and Berry began devoting this time to blogging, teaching, and writing.

== Education and teaching ==
Berry received an MBA from Stanford University. He earned an MA from the University of Oregon, and a BA from the University of Notre Dame.

Berry served as an adjunct professor of entrepreneurship at the University of Oregon.

== Writings and publications ==
Berry contributes content to various business-oriented websites, as well as his own blog and has become well known as an entrepreneur on Twitter.

He is the author of the following books:

- Berry, Tim (August 17, 2015). Lean Business Planning: Get What You Want From Your Business. Motivational Press. ISBN 9781628652130.
- Berry, Tim (2010). Sales and Market Forecasting for Entrepreneurs (Entrepreneurship and Small Business Management Collection). Business Expert Press. pp. 137 pages. ISBN 978-1-6064-9041-9.
- Berry, Tim (2008). 3 Weeks to Startup. Entrepreneur Press. pp. 378 pages. ISBN 978-1-5991-8196-7.
- Berry, Tim (2008). The Plan-As-You-Go Business Plan. Entrepreneur Press. pp. 270 pages. ISBN 978-1-5991-8190-5.
- Berry, Tim (2006). Hurdle: The Book on Business Planning. Palo Alto Software, Inc. pp. 232 pages. ISBN 978-0-9712-1852-9.
- Berry, Tim & Wilson, Doug (2000). On Target : The Book on Marketing Plans. Palo Alto Software Inc. pp. 356 pages. ISBN 978-0-9664-8913-2.
- Berry, Tim (2000). CPA's Guide to Developing Effective Business Plans. Harcourt Brace Professional Pub. pp. 300 pages. ISBN 978-0-1560-6295-4.
- Berry, Tim (1989). Tim Berry's business plan toolkit. Palo Alto Software. pp. 152 pages. ASIN B00072ELLA.
- Berry, Tim (1985). Jazz: The Inside Track (A Byte Book). Mcgraw-Hill Osborne Media. pp. 256 pages. ISBN 978-0-0700-5064-8.
- Berry, Tim (1984). Working smart with electronic spreadsheets: Models for managers. Hayden. pp. 182 pages. ISBN 978-0-8104-6203-8.

== Family and personal ==
Berry has been married to his wife since 1970. He has five children.
