= Borland =

Defunct American software company

Borland Software Corporation
- Type: Subsidiary
- Industry: Computer software
- Founded: 1983 in California (Borland International, Inc.); April 29, 1998 (Inprise Corporation); April 29, 1998 (Borland Software Corporation)
- Founders: Niels Jensen; Ole Henriksen; Mogens Glad; Philippe Kahn
- Defunct: April 5, 2015; 11 years ago
- Fate: acquired by Micro Focus, merged (April 5, 2015)
- Headquarters: Austin, Texas
- Key people: Erik Prusch (acting CEO)
- Products: Borland SilkTest, Borland StarTeam, Borland Together, others
- Revenue: ▼US$172 million (2008)
- Number of employees: approx. 1,100
- Parent: OpenText
- Website: borland.com

Borland Software Corporation was a computing technology company founded in 1983 by Niels Jensen, Ole Henriksen, Mogens Glad, and Philippe Kahn. Its main business was developing and selling software development and software deployment products. Borland was first headquartered in Scotts Valley, California, then in Cupertino, California, and then in Austin, Texas. In 2009, the company became a full subsidiary of the British firm Micro Focus International plc. In 2023, Micro Focus (including Borland) was acquired by Canadian firm OpenText, which later absorbed Borland's portfolio into its application delivery management division.

== History ==
=== The 1980s: Foundations ===
Borland Ltd. was founded in August 1981 by three Danish citizens – Niels Jensen, Ole Henriksen, and Mogens Glad – to develop products, like Word Index, for the CP/M operating system using an off-the-shelf company. After the response to the company's products at the CP/M-82 show in San Francisco, it was determined that a U.S. company would be needed to reach the American market. They then met Philippe Kahn, who had just moved to Silicon Valley and had been a key developer of the Micral. Kahn was chairman, president, and CEO of Borland Inc. at its inception in 1983 until 1995.

The U.S. company was originally named "MIT", standing for "Market In Time". The name "Borland" originated from a small company in Ireland, which was one of MIT's initial customers. After the customer went bankrupt, MIT sought permission to acquire and use the name "Borland" in the U.S., following a legal recommendation during a rebranding prompted by a letter from the Massachusetts Institute of Technology (also abbreviated MIT).

The main shareholders at the incorporation of Borland were Niels Jensen (250,000 shares), Ole Henriksen (160,000), Mogens Glad (100,000), and Kahn (80,000).

=== Borland International, Inc. era ===
Borland developed various software development tools. Its first product was Turbo Pascal in 1983, developed by Anders Hejlsberg (who later developed .NET and C# for Microsoft) and before Borland acquired the product which was sold in Scandinavia under the name Compas Pascal. In 1984, Borland launched Sidekick, a time organization, notebook, and calculator utility that was an early terminate-and-stay-resident program (TSR) for MS-DOS compatible operating systems.

By the mid-1980s, the company had an exhibit at the 1985 West Coast Computer Faire along with IBM and AT&T. Bruce Webster reported that "the legend of Turbo Pascal has by now reached mythic proportions, as evidenced by the number of firms that, in marketing meetings, make plans to become 'the next Borland'". After Turbo Pascal and Sidekick, the company launched other applications such as SuperKey and Lightning, all developed in Denmark. While the Danes remained majority shareholders, board members included Kahn, Tim Berry, John Nash, and David Heller. With the assistance of John Nash and David Heller, both British members of the Borland Board, the company was taken public on London's Unlisted Securities Market (USM) in 1986.

Schroders was the lead investment banker. According to the London IPO filings, the management team was Philippe Kahn as president, Spencer Ozawa as VP of Operations, Marie Bourget as CFO, and Spencer Leyton as VP of sales and business development. All software development continued to take place in Denmark and later London as the Danish co-founders moved there. A first US IPO followed in 1989 after Ben Rosen joined the Borland board with Goldman Sachs as the lead banker and a second offering in 1991 with Lazard as the lead banker.

In 1985, Borland acquired Analytica and its Reflex database product. Forrester Research considered Borland with Analytica, Ashton-Tate, Lotus Development, and Microsoft the "Big Four" of personal computer software. The engineering team of Analytica, managed by Brad Silverberg and including Reflex co-founder Adam Bosworth, became the core of Borland's engineering team in the US. Brad Silverberg was VP of engineering until he left in early 1990 to head up the Personal Systems division at Microsoft. Adam Bosworth initiated and headed up the Quattro project until moving to Microsoft later in 1990 to take over the project which eventually became Access.

In 1987, Borland purchased Wizard Systems and incorporated portions of the Wizard C technology into Turbo C. Bob Jervis, the author of Wizard C became a Borland employee. Turbo C was released on May 18, 1987. This drove a wedge between Borland and Niels Jensen and the other members of his team who had been working on a brand-new series of compilers at their London development centre. They reached an agreement and spun off a company named Jensen & Partners International (JPI), later TopSpeed. JPI first launched an MS-DOS compiler named JPI Modula-2, which later became TopSpeed Modula-2, and followed up with TopSpeed C, TopSpeed C++, and TopSpeed Pascal compilers for both the MS-DOS and OS/2 operating systems. The TopSpeed compiler technology still exists as the underlying technology of the Clarion 4GL programming language, a Windows development tool.

Fiscal 1987 revenue was $29.2 million and pretax earnings were $4.7 million. Borland by that year was directly confronting Lotus and Ashton-Tate. In September 1987, Borland purchased Ansa-Software, including its Paradox (version 2.0) database management tool. Richard Schwartz, a cofounder of Ansa, became Borland's CTO and Ben Rosen joined the Borland board.

The Quattro Pro spreadsheet was launched in 1989. Lotus Development, under the leadership of Jim Manzi, sued Borland for copyright infringement (see Look and feel). The litigation, Lotus Dev. Corp. v. Borland Int'l, Inc., brought forward Borland's open standards position as opposed to Lotus' closed approach. Borland, under Kahn's leadership, took a position of principle and announced that it would defend against Lotus' legal position and "fight for programmer's rights". After a decision in favour of Borland by the First Circuit Court of Appeals, the case went to the United States Supreme Court. Because Justice John Paul Stevens had recused himself, only eight justices heard the case, and concluded in a 4–4 tie. As a result, the First Circuit Court decision remained standing but did not bind any other court and set no national precedent.

Additionally, Borland's approach towards software piracy and intellectual property (IP) included its "Borland no-nonsense license agreement"; allowing the developer/user to utilize its products "just like a book". The user was allowed to make multiple copies of a program, as long as it was the only copy in use at any point in time.

=== The 1990s: Rise and change ===
In September 1991, Borland purchased Ashton-Tate, bringing the dBASE and InterBase databases to the house, in an all-stock transaction. However, competition with Microsoft was fierce. Microsoft launched the competing database Microsoft Access and bought the dBASE clone FoxPro in 1992, undercutting Borland's prices. During the early 1990s, Borland's implementation of C and C++ outsold Microsoft's. Borland survived as a company, but no longer dominated the software tools that it once had. It went through a radical transition in products, financing, and staff, and became a very different company from the one which challenged Microsoft and Lotus in the early 1990s.

The internal problems that arose with the Ashton-Tate merger were a large part of the downfall. Ashton-Tate's product portfolio proved to be weak, with no provision for evolution into the GUI environment of Windows. Almost all product lines were discontinued. The consolidation of duplicate support and development offices was costly and disruptive. Worst of all, the highest revenue earner of the combined company was dBASE with no Windows version ready. Borland had an internal project to clone dBASE which was intended to run on Windows and was part of the strategy of the acquisition, but by late 1992 this was abandoned due to technical flaws and the company had to constitute a replacement team (the ObjectVision team, redeployed) headed by Bill Turpin to redo the job.

Borland lacked the financial strength to project its marketing and move internal resources off other products to shore up the dBASE/W effort. Layoffs occurred in 1993 to keep the company afloat, the third instance of this in five years. By the time dBASE for Windows eventually shipped, the developer community had moved on to other products such as Clipper or FoxBase, and dBASE never regained a significant share of Ashton-Tate's former market. This happened against the backdrop of the rise in Microsoft's combined Office product marketing.

A change in market conditions also contributed to Borland's fall from prominence. In the 1980s, companies had few people who understood the growing personal computer phenomenon and so most technical people were given free rein to purchase whatever software they thought they needed. Borland had done an excellent job marketing to those with a highly technical bent. By the mid-1990s, however, companies were beginning to ask what the return was on the investment they had made in this loosely controlled PC software buying spree. Company executives were starting to ask questions that were hard for technically minded staff to answer, and so corporate standards began to be created. This required new kinds of marketing and support materials from software vendors, but Borland remained focused on the technical side of its products.

In 1993 Borland explored ties with WordPerfect as a possible way to form a suite of programs to rival Microsoft's nascent integration strategy. WordPerfect itself was struggling with a late and troubled transition to Windows. The eventual joint company effort, named Borland Office for Windows (a combination of the WordPerfect word processor, Quattro Pro spreadsheet, and Paradox database) was introduced at the 1993 Comdex computer show. Borland Office never made significant inroads against Microsoft Office. WordPerfect was then bought by Novell. In October 1994, Borland sold Quattro Pro and rights to sell up to a million copies of Paradox to Novell for $140 million in cash, repositioning the company on its core software development tools and the Interbase database engine and shifting toward client-server scenarios in corporate applications. This later proved a good foundation for the shift to web development tools.

Philippe Kahn and the Borland board disagreed on how to focus the company, and Kahn resigned as chairman, CEO and president, after 12 years, in January 1995. Kahn remained on the board until November 7, 1996. Borland named Gary Wetsel as CEO, but he resigned in July 1996. William F. Miller was interim CEO until September of that year, when Whitney G. Lynn (the current chairman at mergers & acquisitions company XRP Healthcare) became interim president and CEO (along with other executive changes), followed by a succession of CEOs including Dale Fuller and Tod Nielsen.

The Delphi 1 rapid application development (RAD) environment was launched in 1995, under the leadership of Anders Hejlsberg.

In 1996 Borland acquired Open Environment Corporation, a Cambridge-based company founded by John J. Donovan.

On November 25, 1996, Del Yocam was hired as Borland CEO and chairman.

In 1997, Borland sold Paradox to Corel, but retained all development rights for the core BDE. In November 1997, Borland acquired Visigenic, a middleware company that was focused on implementations of CORBA.

=== Inprise Corporation era ===
In April 1998, Borland International, Inc. announced it had become Inprise Corporation.

For several years, before and during the Inprise name, Borland suffered from serious financial losses and poor public image. When the name was changed to Inprise, many thought Borland had gone out of business. In March 1999, dBASE was sold to KSoft, Inc. which was soon renamed dBASE Inc. (In 2004 dBASE Inc. was renamed to DataBased Intelligence, Inc.).

In 1999, Dale L. Fuller replaced Yocam. At this time Fuller's title was "interim president and CEO". The "interim" was dropped in December 2000. Keith Gottfried served in senior executive positions with the company from 2000 to 2004.

A proposed merger between Inprise and Corel was announced in February 2000, aimed at producing Linux-based products. The plan was abandoned when Corel's shares fell and it became clear that there was no strategic fit.

InterBase 6.0 was made available as open-source software in July 2000.

In November 2000, Inprise Corporation announced the company intended to officially change its name to Borland Software Corporation. The legal name of the company would continue to be Inprise Corporation until the completion of the renaming process during the first quarter of 2001. Once the name change was completed, the company would also expect to change its Nasdaq market symbol from "INPR" to "BORL".

=== Borland Software Corporation era ===
On January 2, 2001, Borland Software Corporation announced it had completed its name change from Inprise Corporation. Effective at the opening of trading on Nasdaq, the company's Nasdaq market symbol would also be changed from "INPR" to "BORL".

Under the Borland name and a new management team headed by president and CEO Dale L. Fuller, a now-smaller and profitable Borland refocused on Delphi and created a version of Delphi and C++Builder for Linux, both under the name Kylix. This brought Borland's expertise in integrated development environments to the Linux platform for the first time. Kylix was launched in 2001.

Plans to spin off the InterBase division as a separate company were abandoned after Borland and the people who were to run the new company could not agree on terms for the separation. Borland stopped open-source releases of InterBase and has developed and sold new versions at a fast pace.

In 2001, Delphi 6 became the first integrated development environment to support web services. All of the company's development platforms now support web services.

C#Builder was released in 2003 as a native C# development tool, competing with Visual Studio .NET. By the 2005 release, C#Builder, Delphi for Win32, and Delphi for .NET were combined into one IDE named "Borland Developer Studio", though it was still popularly known as "Delphi". In late 2002 Borland purchased design tool vendor TogetherSoft and tool publisher Starbase, makers of the StarTeam configuration management tool and the CaliberRM requirements management tool (eventually, CaliberRM was renamed as "Caliber"). The latest releases of JBuilder and Delphi integrate these tools to give developers a broader set of tools for development.

Former CEO Dale Fuller quit in July 2005, but remained on the board of directors. Former COO Scott Arnold took the title of interim president and chief executive officer until November 8, 2005, when it was announced that Tod Nielsen would take over as CEO effective November 9, 2005. Nielsen remained with the company until January 2009, when he accepted the position of chief operating officer at VMware; CFO Erik Prusch then took over as acting president and CEO.

In early 2007 Borland announced new branding for its focus around open application life-cycle management. In April 2007 Borland announced that it would relocate its headquarters and development facilities to Austin, Texas. It also had development centers in Singapore, Santa Ana, California, Prague, Czech Republic, and Linz, Austria.

On May 6, 2009, the company announced it was to be acquired by Micro Focus for $75 million. The transaction was approved by Borland shareholders on July 22, 2009, with Micro Focus acquiring the company for $1.50 per share. Following Micro Focus shareholder approval and the required corporate filings, the transaction was completed in late July 2009. Borland was estimated to have 750 employees at the time.

On April 5, 2015, Micro Focus announced the completion of integrating the Attachmate Group of companies that was merged on November 20, 2014. During the integration period, the affected companies were merged into one organization. In the announced reorganization, Borland products would be part of the Micro Focus portfolio.

== Subsidiaries ==
- Leaders: In October 2005, Borland acquired Leaders, to add its IT management and governance suite, named Tempo, to the Borland product line.
- CodeGear: On February 8, 2006, Borland announced the divestiture of its IDE division, including Delphi, JBuilder, and InterBase. At the same time, it announced the planned acquisition of Segue Software, a maker of software test and quality tools, to concentrate on application life-cycle management (ALM). On March 20, 2006, Borland announced its acquisition of Gauntlet Systems, a provider of technology that screens software under development for quality and security. On November 14, 2006, Borland announced its decision to separate the developer tools group into a wholly owned subsidiary. The newly formed operation, CodeGear, was responsible for four IDE product lines. On May 7, 2008, Borland announced the sale of the CodeGear division to Embarcadero Technologies for an expected $23 million price and $7 million in CodeGear accounts receivables retained by Borland.

== Products ==
=== Recent ===
The products acquired from Segue Software include Silk Central, Silk Performer, and Silk Test. The Silk line was first announced in 1997. Other programs are:

- Borland AppServer
- Borland Caliber DefineIT
- Borland CaliberRM
- Borland Enterprise Server
- Borland Enterprise Studio, for C++, Mobile and Java
- Borland Gauntlet
- StarTeam
- Borland Tempo
- Together
- Visibroker

=== Historical products ===
- Borland C++
- Borland Delphi
- Brief (text editor)
- C++Builder, C++BuilderX
- C#Builder
- CodeWright
- Entera (acquired from OEC)
- Eureka: The Solver (numerical solver for mathematical systems of equations)
- IntraBuilder
- JBuilder
- Kylix
- ObjectVision
- Turbo Assembler
- Turbo BASIC (now PowerBASIC)
- Turbo C
- Turbo C++
- Turbo Debugger
- Turbo Delphi
- Turbo Pascal
- Turbo Pascal Database Toolbox
- Turbo Pascal Editor Toolbox
- Turbo Pascal Graphix Toolbox
- Turbo Pascal Numerical Methods Toolbox
- Turbo Pascal Tutor
- Turbo Profiler
- Turbo Prolog (now Visual Prolog)
- dBase
- InterBase
- Borland Paradox
- Sidekick
- Sidekick Plus
- SuperKey
- Turbo Lightning (TSR spell checker)
- Borland Eureka the Solver
- Borland Reflex
- Quattro
- Quattro Pro
- Sprint
- Turbo GameWorks (Turbo Pascal source and executables for bridge, Gomoku, and chess)
- Word Wizard (Requires Turbo Lightning)

=== Unreleased software ===
- Turbo Modula-2: Later sold by TopSpeed as TopSpeed Modula-2.

== Marketing ==
- CB Magazine: It is an official magazine by Borland Japan. The magazine was republished on April 3, 1997.

=== Renaming to Inprise Corporation ===
Along with renaming from Borland International, Inc. to Inprise Corporation, the company refocused its efforts on targeting enterprise applications development. Borland hired a marketing firm Lexicon Branding to come up with a new name for the company. Yocam explained that the new name, Inprise, was meant to evoke "integrating the enterprise". The idea was to integrate Borland's tools, Delphi, C++Builder, and JBuilder with enterprise environment software, including Visigenic's implementations of CORBA, Visibroker for C++ and Java, and the new product, Application Server.

=== Frank Borland ===
Frank Borland is a mascot character for Borland products. According to Philippe Kahn, the mascot first appeared in advertisements and the cover of Borland Sidekick 1.0 manual, which was in 1984 during Borland International, Inc. era. Frank Borland also appeared in Turbo Tutor - A Turbo Pascal Tutorial, Borland JBuilder 2.

A live action version of Frank Borland was made after Micro Focus plc had acquired Borland Software Corporation. This version was created by True Agency Limited. An introductory film was also made about the mascot.

== See also ==
- List of file formats (alphabetical)
- Lotus Development Corp. v. Borland International, Inc.

== General references ==
- Azhar (September 2016). "Allied Enterprises – Integrating the Enterprise". Allied Enterprises – A Company for everything.
- Jeffers, Michelle (November 27, 2000). "Getting Chance to Dance". Forbes.
- Kellner, Tomas (September 7, 2001). "Survivor". Fortune.
- Krey, Michael. "Borland Founder Kahn Focuses On Sending Photos Over Cell Phones". Investor's Business Daily. Archived from the original on 2006-03-23.
- Parks, Bob (October 2000). "The Big Picture – Borland International Inc.'s Philippe Kahn". Wired.
- Taft, Darryl (November 2006). "Borland Launches CodeGear to Supply Developers with Tools of the Trade". eWeek.
- Intersimone, David (December 7, 1999). "Will The Real Frank Borland Please Stand Up?". Borland History.
