= CodeGear =

Company

- Company type: Private (wholly owned subsidiary)
- Industry: Computer software
- Founded: California (2006)
- Headquarters: Scotts Valley, California
- Key people: Jim Douglas — CEO
- Products: Delphi, JBuilder, C++ Builder, InterBase
- Number of employees: 200 est. (2006)
- Parent: Embarcadero Technologies
- Website: CodeGear

CodeGear is a wholly owned division of Embarcadero Technologies. CodeGear develops software development tools such as the Delphi Integrated development environment, the programming language Delphi, and the database server InterBase. Originally a division of Borland Software Corporation, it was launched on 14 November 2006.

== History ==
On 8 February 2006 Borland announced that it would seek a buyer for its IDE division and database products. During the spin-off negotiations, these divisions ("developer tools group") internally reorganized into a division called CodeGear. Eventually, five parties bid for the group. However, no bidder offered Borland "numbers that appropriately reflected the value we think is in the business," according to a conference call with Borland CEO Tod Nielsen.

Borland's 2006 annual report showed that its CodeGear IDE business had sales of US$75.7 million in 2006, which accounted for 25 percent of Borland's total revenue.

On 7 May 2008, Borland Software Corporation and Embarcadero Technologies announced that Embarcadero had "signed a definitive asset purchase agreement to purchase CodeGear."

On 1 July 2008, Embarcadero Technologies announced the completed acquisition of CodeGear from Borland Software Corporation on 30 June 2008, for approximately $24.5 million.

=== Embarcadero Technologies, Inc. era ===
On 25 August 2008, Embarcadero Technologies announced the release of Delphi 2009 and C++Builder 2009.

On 28 September 2008, Embarcadero Technologies announced the release of InterBase SMP 2009.

On 1 December 2008, Embarcadero Technologies announced the general availability of CodeGear RAD Studio 2009.

== Products ==
- RAD Studio (including Delphi, Delphi Prism and C++Builder)
- Delphi for PHP
- Delphi
- Delphi Prism
- JBuilder
- InterBase
- C++Builder
- JGear
- 3rdRail
