= InterBase =

Relational database management system

- Developer: Embarcadero Technologies
- Stable release: InterBase 15 / October 2025; 1 year ago
- Operating system: Cross-platform
- Type: Database management system
- License: Proprietary
- Website: www.embarcadero.com/products/interbase

InterBase is a relational database management system (RDBMS) currently developed and marketed by Embarcadero Technologies. It runs on the operating systems Microsoft Windows, macOS, Linux, Solaris, Android, and iOS.

== Technology ==
InterBase is a SQL-92-compliant relational database and supports standard interfaces such as JDBC, ODBC, and ADO.NET.

== History ==
=== Multiversion concurrency control before InterBase ===
Multiversion concurrency control is described in some detail in sections 4.3 and 5.5 of the 1981 paper "Concurrency Control in Distributed Database Systems" by Philip Bernstein and Nathan Goodman while employed by the Computer Corporation of America. Bernstein and Goodman's paper cites a 1978 dissertation by D.P. Reed, which describes MVCC and claims it as an original work.

=== Early years ===
Jim Starkey was working at DEC on their DATATRIEVE 4th generation language 4GL product when he came up with an idea for a system to manage concurrent changes by many users. The idea simplified the existing problems of locking which were proving to be a serious problem for the new relational database systems being developed at the time.

Although InterBase's implementation is much more similar to the system described by Reed in his MIT dissertation than any other database that existed at the time and Starkey knew Bernstein from his previous position at the Computer Corporation of America and later at DEC, Starkey claims that he arrived at the idea of multiversion concurrency control independently. According to his blog, Starkey says:

The inspiration for multi-generational concurrency control was a database system done by Prime that supported page level snapshots. The intention of the feature was to give a reader a consistent view of the database without blocking writers. The idea intrigued me as a very useful characteristic of a database system.

=== Open source ===
In early 2000, Borland announced that InterBase would be released under open-source, and began negotiations to spin off a separate company to manage the product. The source code for InterBase version 6 was released under a variant of the Mozilla Public License in mid-2000.

With the InterBase division at Borland under new management, the company released a proprietary version of InterBase version 6 and then 6.5. Borland released several updates to the open source code before announcing that it would no longer actively develop the open source project. Firebird, an open source fork of the InterBase 6 code, however, remains in active development.

In 2001, a backdoor was discovered in the software that had been present in all versions since 1994 and then resolved.

=== CodeGear ===
On May 7, 2008, Borland and Embarcadero Technologies announced that Embarcadero had "signed a definitive asset purchase agreement to purchase CodeGear." The acquisition, for approximately $24.5 million, closed on 30 June 2008.

=== Recent releases ===
The most recent release is InterBase 15.1, an update to version 15, which included mainly encryption and security improvements.

A list of releases with their primary On Disk Structure (ODS) version:

InterBase Version	ODS	Released
15	19	2025-10
2020	18	2019-11
2017	17	2017-03
XE7	16	2014-12
XE3	15	2012-09
XE	15	2010-09
2009	13	2008-09
2007	12	2006-09

== See also ==
- Comparison of relational database management systems
- List of relational database management systems
