= Embarcadero Technologies =

American computer software company

Embarcadero Technologies, Inc.
- Type: Private company
- Industry: Software development Web development Database design Database management system
- Founded: October 1993
- Headquarters: Austin, Texas, U.S.
- Products: RAD Studio, Delphi, C++Builder, InterBase, Embarcadero Dev-C++
- Owner: Idera, Inc.
- Number of employees: 500
- Website: embarcadero.com

Embarcadero Technologies, Inc. is a U.S.-based computer software company that develops, manufactures, licenses and supports products and services related to software through several product divisions. It was founded in 1993, went public in 2000 and private in 2007, and became a division of Idera, Inc. in 2015.

== History ==
Embarcadero was founded in October 1993 by Stephen Wong, Stuart Browning, and Nigel Myers and released a tool for Sybase database administrators in December of the same year called Rapid SQL. It later added tools for software development on Microsoft Windows and other operating systems, and for database design, development and management, for platforms including Oracle, Microsoft SQL Server, IBM DB2, and MySQL.

In April 2000, Embarcadero Technologies had its initial public offering, and was listed on NASDAQ with the symbol EMBT.

In November the same year, the company acquired GDPro, a Unified Modeling Language software provider. In October 2005 Embarcadero acquired data security business Ambeo. In June 2007, Thoma Cressey Bravo bought Embarcadero, and it became a private company. Wayne Williams was appointed chief executive officer of Embarcadero Technologies in 2007.

On May 7, 2008 Borland Software Corporation announced its software development tools division, CodeGear, was to be sold to Embarcadero Technologies for an expected $23 million price and $7 million in CodeGear accounts receivables retained by Borland. The acquisition closed on June 30, 2008, for approximately $24.5 million.

In December 2011, Embarcadero announced AppWave, an enterprise app store for PCs running Microsoft Windows instead of mobile phones. The platform supports Embarcadero software, commercial titles, and free and open source apps. In April 2012 the platform was moved to a web site called AppWave Store.

The corporate headquarters is located in Austin, Texas, with an international office located in Brazil. As of 2012 the company had an annual revenue of $100 million, and around 500 employees on its payroll.

In 2014 Embarcadero Technologies nearly acquired the CA ERwin Data Modeler product from CA, Inc. This acquisition was blocked by the Department of Justice over anti-competitive concerns.

On October 7, 2015, Idera, Inc. announced an agreement to acquire Embarcadero Technologies, Inc., but the Embarcadero mark was retained for the developer tools division. As of October 28, 2015, Embarcadero was listed as 'acquired'.

== Products ==
=== Database products ===
Until 2015, Embarcadero sold products like Rapid SQL and DB Artisan, and ER/Studio, and these products are now sold by its parent company directly, Idera. Interbase, a lightweight database for desktop and mobile app development, remained an Embarcadero product in 2016.

=== Application development ===
In July 2008 Embarcadero acquired CodeGear from the Borland Software Corporation.

Codegear owned a number of application development products, and some that were still developed in 2016 were:

- Delphi is a rapid application development (RAD) environment and object-oriented dialect of the Pascal programming language, developed from Turbo Pascal. Delphi runs on Microsoft Windows, and produces applications for Windows, Mac OS X, and iOS and Android portable devices.
- C++Builder is equivalent to Delphi, but is based on the C++ programming language instead of Pascal, using the Delphi Visual Component Library and a native C++ compiler. Most components developed in Delphi can be used in C++Builder with no modification, although the reverse is not true.
- Embarcadero RAD Studio is a rapid application development package which includes Delphi and C++Builder for building native Windows, mobile and database applications.
- RadPHP was an integrated development environment (IDE) for the PHP programming language. It was discontinued in 2012.
