= GSD =

GSD may refer to:

== Places ==
- Garsdale railway station, England (GB CRS code)
- Georgia School for the Deaf, Cave Spring, Georgia, United States
- Harvard Graduate School of Design, Gund Hall, Cambridge, Massachusetts, US

== Science and technology ==
=== Biology and medicine ===
- Genetic significant dose
- German Shepherd dog
- Global Species Database
- Glutathione synthetase deficiency
- Glycogen storage disease

=== Other uses in science and technology ===
- GSD microscopy
- GSD chemical file format
- Geometric standard deviation
- Graphical system design
- Ground sample distance

== Other uses ==
- Gender and sexual diversity
- Gibraltar Social Democrats, a political party in Gibraltar
- Go Skateboarding Day
- General sewing data or garment sewing data, in a predetermined motion time system
- Great Sun of Discovery, in the dating system used by the Improved Order of Red Men
- Government shutdown
- Get Stuff Done

== See also ==
- General Security Directorate (disambiguation)
- General Staff Department (disambiguation)
- GSD&M, an American advertising agency
- GSDP or gross domestic product
- GSDS (disambiguation)
