= FlashFXP =

- FlashFXP 4.0 running on Windows 7
- Developer: OpenSight Software, LLC
- Stable release: 5.4.0.3970 / April 1, 2017; 9 years ago
- Written in: Delphi
- Operating system: XP, Vista, 7, 8, 8.1, 10, 11
- Available in: Multilingual
- Type: FTP/FXP/SFTP client
- License: Proprietary
- Website: www.flashfxp.com

FlashFXP is a proprietary FTP client with a simple Windows-based GUI. FlashFXP supports both client-to-server and server-to-server (FXP) transfers, in addition to SCP/SFTP.

== History ==
In the summer of 1998, Charles DeWeese (nicknamed flashd/bigstar) was hanging out with friends on Internet Relay Chat. Around April, a few of his friends suggested he create an FXP client because the existing FXP clients weren't very reliable. After a few weeks of tossing ideas back and forth, he decided that his next project would be an FXP client. DeWeese started developing MyFXP in Visual Basic 4, but he soon realized that Visual Basic fell short in many areas. A friend, the author of LeapFTP, suggested that he use Borland Delphi. Therefore, DeWeese switched to Borland Delphi 4. Although the original name was MyFXP, the program was later renamed to FlashFXP, and on June 24, 1998, FlashFXP was started. Nearly a month later, on July 23, 1998, FlashFXP 1.0 was released.

Version 1.2 was the first shareware version of FlashFXP.

Version 2.0 was a significant milestone for FlashFXP by providing SSL/TLS support.

By 2003, FlashFXP became successful. As a result, DeWeese was unable to keep up with the development, support, and sales by himself. He later signed an exclusive deal with iniCom Networks, Inc and released version 3.0.

In late 2009, FlashFXP became part of the newly formed Opensight Software, LLC, which DeWeese is sole owner of. Sales are fully automated via share-it, PayPal, and the FlashFXP website, although support is provided by the developer and other people at the support forums.

Version 4.0 included additional functionality, advanced features and has been reviewed as being more extensive compared to free FTP clients.

The last version of FlashFXP was released on April 1, 2017. In May 2017, DeWeese was arrested, charged and pled guilty for federal exploitation of a minor. He was sentenced to 15 years in federal prison.

== Features ==
- SFTP Support
- IPv6 Support
- FTP / FXP Support
- SSL/TLS (SSCP and CPSV)
- Transfer queuing
- Backup/Restore Settings
- Site Manager (with XML import/export)
- FTP caching for browsing and queuing during a transfer or while not connected
- Proxy and firewall support
- Remote file editing with automatic upload on save
- Automated file transfer scheduling with e-mail notifications
- File transfer rules based on size, and, or date
- Integrated language translation editor
- MODE Z support for on-the-fly streaming compression.
- Localization in many languages (Bulgarian, Catalan, Chinese Simplified, Chinese Traditional, Czech, Dutch, English, European Portuguese, French, German, Hungarian, Italian, Japanese, Korean, Polish, Russian, Spanish, Swedish, Turkish)

== See also ==
- Total Commander
- WinSCP
