= Synthetic instrument =

Software that performs a specific synthesis, analysis, or measurement function

In metrology (test and measurement science), a synthetic instrument is software that performs a specific synthesis, analysis, or measurement function. A Synthetic Measurement System (SMS) is a common, general purpose, physical hardware platform that is intended to perform many kinds of synthesis, analysis, or measurement functions using synthetic instruments.

Typically the generic SMS hardware is dual cascade of three subsystems: digital processing and control, analog-to-digital or digital-to-analog conversion (codec), and signal conditioning. One cascade is for stimulus, one for response. Sandwiched between them is the device under test (DUT) that is being measured.

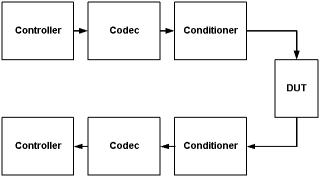
Synthetic Measurement System

A synthetic instrument is the opposite of the retronym natural instrument. Although the word “synthetic” in the phrase synthetic instrument might seem to imply that synthetic instruments are synthesizers: that they only do synthesis; this is incorrect. The instrument itself is being synthesized; nothing is implied about what the instrument does. A synthetic instrument might indeed be a synthesizer, but it could just as easily be an analyzer, or some hybrid of the two.

Synthetic instruments are implemented on generic hardware, i.e., generic meaning that the underlying hardware is not explicitly designed to perform the particular measurement. This is probably the most salient characteristic of a synthetic instrument. Measurement specificity is encapsulated totally in software. The hardware does not define the measurement.

An analogy to this relationship between specific measurement hardware versus generic hardware with its function totally defined in software is the relationship between specific digital circuits and a general purpose CPU. A specific digital circuit can be designed and hardwired with digital logic parts to perform a specific calculation. Alternatively, a microprocessor (or, better yet, a gate array) could be used to perform the same calculation using appropriate software. One case is specific, the other generic, with the specificity encapsulated in software.

At the software level, portability of measurement description is the key attribute that distinguishes a synthetic instrument from the more commonly found instrumentation software—software that is limited to hardware scripting and data flow processing. Not all measurement related software systems inherently provide for the abstract, portable synthesis of measurements. Even if they do have such provisions, they may not typically be applied that way by users, especially if the system encourages non-abstracted access to hardware. Application software packages such as Measure Foundry and LabVIEW are typically used with explicit structural links to the natural measurements made by specific hardware and therefore usually are not synthesizing measurements from an abstract description. On the other hand, should a software system be used to synthesize measurement functions as descriptive behavioral constructs, rather than hardware referenced structural data flow descriptions, this is true measurement synthesis. An analogy here is the distinction between a non portable structural description and an abstract behavioral description of digital logic that we see in HDL systems like Verilog.

Synthetic instruments in test and measurement are conceptually related to the software synthesizer in audio or music. A musical instrument synthesizer synthesizes the sound of specific instruments from generic hardware. Of course, a significant difference in these concepts is that musical instrument synthesizers typically only generate musical sound, whereas a synthetic instrument in test and measurement may be equally likely to generate or to measure some signal or parameter.

A similar term commonly used in test and measurement, Virtual instrumentation, is a superset of synthetic instrumentation. All synthetic instruments are virtual instruments; however, the two terms are different when virtual instrument software mirrors and augments non-generic instrument hardware, providing a soft front panel, or managing the data flow to and from a natural instrument. In this case, the PC and accompanying software is supplementing the analysis and presentation capabilities of the natural instrument.

The essential point is this: synthetic instruments are synthesized. The whole is greater than the sum of the parts. To use Buckminster Fuller's word, synthetic instruments are synergistic instruments. Like a triangle is more than three lines, synthetic instruments are more than the triangle of hardware (Control, Codec, Conditioning) they are implemented on.

Therefore, one way to tell if you have a true synthetic instrument is to examine the hardware design alone and to try to figure out what sort of instrument it might be. If all you can determine are basic category facts, like the fact that it can be categorized as a stimulus or response instrument, but not anything about what it's particularly designed to create or measure—if the measurement specificity is all hidden in software—then you likely have a true synthetic instrument.

The DoD has created a standards body called the Synthetic Instrument Working Group (SIWG) whose role is to define standards for interoperability of synthetic instrument systems. The SIWG defines a synthetic instruments (SI) as:

A reconfigurable system that links a series of elemental hardware and software components with standardized interfaces to generate signals or make measurements using numeric processing techniques.

== See also ==
- Synthetic measure
