= CompactDAQ =

- A CompactDAQ chassis with 8 different I/O modules plugged in.
- Manufacturer: National Instruments
- Available: In production
- Website: www.ni.com/compactdaq

CompactDAQ is a data acquisition platform built by National Instruments that includes a broad set of compatible hardware and software. CompactDAQ integrates hardware for data I/O with LabVIEW software to enable engineers to collect, process and analyse sensor data. CompactDAQ systems are less expensive than equivalent systems within the NI PXI Platform.

== Hardware ==
CompactDAQ systems are managed by a chassis controller module, which controls data transfer between up-to 8 I/O modules and a PC. The chassis controller contains a timing controller that synchronizes data acquisition from all connected I/O modules. The following types of chassis controllers are available:

- USB Chassis - designed for small, portable, mixed-measurement systems on the benchtop or in the field
- Ethernet Chassis - ideal for distributed measurement systems in locations where Ethernet networking infrastructure already exists
- Wireless Chassis - zero configuration setup over Wi-Fi and support for over 50 measurement-specific modules

CompactDAQ systems connect to sensors via wired or wireless I/O modules, connected to a chassis controller. Currently only NI C Series modules are compatible with the CompactDAQ platform. Modules are available with analog inputs and outputs for various sensor and signal types, digital inputs and outputs, built-in signal conditioning and ADCs, and most modules provide electrical isolation.

== Software ==
Sensor data is collected and analyzed using compatible PC software such as LabVIEW, LabWindows/CVI, Measurement Studio and SignalExpress, also built by National Instruments. Application programming interfaces are also available for C/C++, and .NET languages such as C#.

LabVIEW integrates with CompactDAQ chassis controller hardware to connect to physical sensor or signal data sources. LabVIEW can also connect to oscilloscopes and USB DAQ systems using the Measurement and Automation eXplorer (MAX) LabVIEW component.

In LabVIEW, virtual instruments can be configured and simulated, in order to test data processing when physical hardware is not available. The Virtual Instrument Software Architecture (VISA) is the back-end component that manages communication between LabVIEW and CompactDAQ hardware.

NI SignalExpress LE is provided with every chassis controller for basic data logging and analysis. NI SignalExpress is a Microsoft Windows application that provides features for acquiring, analyzing, and displaying data from compatible data acquisition devices and instruments.

== See also ==
- CompactRIO
