= Graphical system design =

Graphical system design (GSD) is a modern approach to designing measurement and control systems that integrates system design software with COTS hardware to dramatically simplify development. This approach combines user interfaces, models of computation, math and analysis, Input/output signals, technology abstractions, and various deployment target. It allows domain experts, or non- implementation experts, to access to design capabilities where they would traditionally need to outsource a system design expert.

This approach to system design is a super-set of electronic system-level (ESL) design. Graphical system design expands on the EDA-based ESL definition to include other types of embedded system design including industrial machines and medical devices. Many of these expanded applications can be defined as "the long tail" applications.

== System-level design ==
Graphical system design is an approach to designing an entire system, using more intuitive graphical software and off-the-shelf (non-custom) hardware devices to refine the design, create initial prototypes, and even use for few runs of deployment. The approach may involve Algorithm engineering. The approach can prove successful when designers need to get something to market quickly (medical video: ) or with a team of non-embedded experts like Boston Engineering to create a mechatronics-based machine.

"Graphical system design is a complementary but encompassing platform-based approach that includes embedded and electronic system design, implementation, and verification tools. ESL and graphical system design are really part of the same movement--higher abstraction and more design automation looking to solve the real engineering challenges that designers are facing today--addressing design flaws that are introduced at the specification stage to ensure they're detected well before validation for on-time product delivery."

== Tools ==
Graphical system design relies on open connectivity. For example, tools that can be used in the design phase include (in alphabetical order): Ansoft Designer, AutoCAD, CarSim, DOORS, Dymola, LabVIEW, MSC.Adams, NI Multisim, NEi Nastran, SolidWorks, SPICE, OpenWire (library).

The prototyping stage is more about taking algorithm design and implementing them on hardware for higher quality designs. An effective prototyping platform includes a high-level language, real-time processors, FPGA logic, modular I/O and any intellectual property needed.

The deploy stage is mostly about hardware - where you put your design in the final stage. This may involve MPUs or FPGAs.

== Examples ==
Examples of engineers and scientists applying graphical system design techniques include:

- Graphical System Design for Digital Radio Mondiale
- Researchers Use Graphical System Design for Development and Control of Unmanned Underwater Vehicles
- Developing a Robotic Manipulator for Cancer Therapy Using Graphical System Design
- Graphical system design for embedded control systems
