= Volko Audio =

- Genre: Music technology
- Founded: 2004
- Founder: Volkan Özyılmaz (Founder)
- Headquarters: Istanbul, Turkey
- Products: Volko Baglama, Volko Alaturka Drum
- Website: http://www.volkoaudio.com

Volko Audio is a music technology company located in Turkey, Istanbul that produces virtual instruments and audio effects. It is the first company to produce virtual instruments in Turkey. Its product Volko Baglama is the first Turkish professional virtual instrument in the world.

== History ==
The company was founded in August 2004 by Volkan Özyılmaz. Its was originally named Volko and the first product was Volko Baglama which was released in 2005. Volko Baglama is the first virtual professional baglama instrument. In July 2009 the firm started the second project, the Volko Alaturka Drum. The company changed its name to Volko Audio in May 2010. The Volko Alaturka Drum was released in January 2011.

== Volko Baglama ==
Volko Baglama was released on 31 May 2005 and was described as the first Turkish made virtual instrument by Kvr Audio, a website dedicated to audio effects and virtual instruments. In July 2005, the Turkish music technology magazine "Volume" reviewed Volko Baglama and also mentioned it being the first virtual instrument made in Turkey.

== Volko Alaturka Drum ==
Volko Alaturka Drum is a virtual instrument drummer which can play middle eastern rhythms. It was announced at 13 January 2011 Kvr Audio News Item.

It was reviewed by Paolo Tonelli on Audio Video Music Magazine in Italy. Review The review highlights: "A complete plug-in equipped with various styles, colors, imagination and music taste which is able to introduce us many new ideas." "(A) Plug-in which is dedicated to the traditional rhythms of (the) middle east."

In 2013 May, audiofanzine website reviewed Volko Alaturka Drum in The Best Virtual Drums list saying "Volko Alaturka Drum is quite special: it allows you to incorporate rhythms from the Middle East and North Africa into your songs, but with a somewhat "western" sound."
