= James Truchard =

American businessman

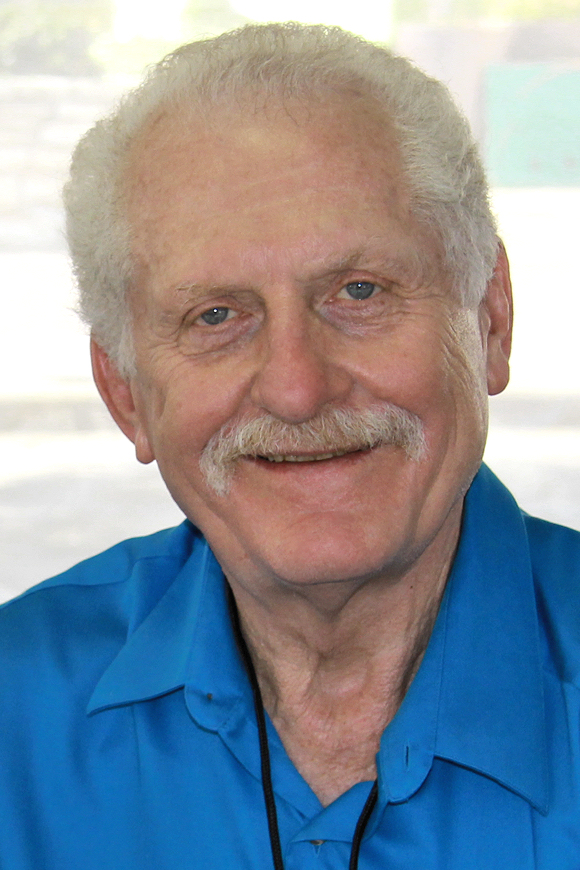
- Truchard at the 2014 Texas Book Festival.
- Born: June 25, 1943 (age 82); Austin County, Texas (USA)
- Occupation(s): CEO, National Instruments
- Spouse: Marci Truchard
- Children: Michael, John, Anthony, Aimee
- Parent(s): Joe Truchard and Lillie Schneider

James Joseph Truchard (born June 25, 1943, in Austin County, Texas) is an American billionaire, electrical engineer, and a businessman who is the co-founder and former president and CEO of National Instruments, a company producing automated test equipment and virtual instrumentation software. Truchard is a member of the National Academy of Engineering and the Royal Swedish Academy of Engineering Sciences.

== Biography ==
Truchard was born June 25, 1943, in Austin County, Texas, the fourth of seven children born to Joe Truchard and Lillie Schneider. Truchard earned a B.S. and an M.S. in physics, and a Ph.D. in electrical engineering from the University of Texas at Austin. Following his graduation, Truchard worked as managing director of the acoustical measurements division at the U.T. Applied Research Laboratories.

== Founding a company ==
After two years of working for U.T., Truchard realized that there was little room for promotion unless one of his coworkers retired. As he often remarks, he "didn't see a job I wanted [in Austin] - so I created one!" Working with colleagues Jeff Kodosky and Bill Nowlin, Truchard was part of a project conducting research for the U.S. Navy that allowed them to use early computer technology to collect and analyze data. Frustrated with the inefficient data collection methods they were using, the three decided to create a product that would enable their task to be done more easily. In 1976, working in the garage at Truchard's home, the three founded National Instruments and began designing an interface board.

The group hired their first employee, Kim Harrison-Hoson in 1977 to process orders and deal with customers. Truchard's job at UT had provided him with some experience in developing products but not with managing employees or a business, so he read many books on the business and management principles in order to learn how to run a company. In 1979, as they reached $300,000 in sales, Truchard was able to leave his job at UT to concentrate on his new company full-time.

In 1986, in conjunction with Kodosky, Truchard played a pivotal role in the development of the LabVIEW graphical development software, which allows scientists to quickly build solutions for their measurement and automation needs. The graphical programming interface that LabVIEW provided revolutionized the way engineers and scientists worked.

== National Instruments ==
After the release of LabVIEW, the company's future seemed secured. Under Truchard's leadership, NI has seen growth and record revenue in 35 of its 37 years (except 2001 and 2009). With the goal of balancing the success of customers, employees, shareholders, and suppliers, Truchard has led with a conservative, deliberate approach. The company focuses on innovation, growth, and expansion and prizes innovation and entrepreneurship, and has been named as one of the Fortune "100 Best Companies to Work For" for fourteen consecutive years (2000–2013).

Affectionately known to his employees as "Dr. T", Truchard insists that he and others in the management structure at NI remain accessible to their employees. Despite his stature as the sole CEO in the company's history, Truchard is still an approachable and down-to-earth individual. He still drives an old pick up truck to work, where he does not have an assigned parking space. Unless he is scheduled to attend an external business meeting, Truchard wears denim jeans to work every day, and sits in a cubicle in the middle of the 8th floor, where employees are free to walk up and discuss any issues they might have. On January 1, 2017, Truchard retired as president and CEO. He continued to hold his position as chairman of the board until his resignation in September 2018.

== Professional activities and recognition ==
Shortly after the development of LabVIEW, in 1987 Truchard received one of the first Texas High Technology Entrepreneur awards. Twelve years later he was awarded a Texas High Technology Master Entrepreneur of the Year honor. He was named one of the nation's 50 Best CEOs in three consecutive years by Worth Magazine. In 2002, Truchard was inducted into the Electronic Design Engineering Hall of Fame, and the following year he was elected to the Royal Swedish Academy of Engineering Sciences. He has also been named a University of Texas Distinguished Engineering Graduate. In 2007, Truchard was elected as a member into the National Academy of Engineering for creating 'virtual instrumentation,' which enabled the rapid development of customized measurement systems in industry, academia, and classrooms. In 2018 he was the recipient of Armenia's Global High-Tech Award.

Truchard is a member and former chairman of the Engineering Foundation Advisory Council, and is a member of the University of Texas Chancellor's Council. He previously served on the UT Electrical and Computer Engineering Visiting Committee, and was a founding member of the Austin Software Council. Texas governor Rick Perry appointed Truchard to the state's Advisory Council on the Digital Economy and invited Truchard to chair the Texas Science, Technology, and Math Industry Advisory Council, which seeks to reverse the declining interest of young people in technical careers.

== Personal life ==
Truchard lives in Austin, Texas in a house overlooking Lake Austin. He had four children with his wife Lee, who died in 2012 after prolonged illness. In August 2015 he married Marci Truchard. As of March 2018, he is worth an estimated $1.1 billion. Truchard is heavily invested in the advancement and curing of Alzheimer's disease and funds projects, such as the Oskar Fischer Project, to do so.
