= Measurement Studio =

Extension for MIcrosoft Visual Studio

- Mstudio logo.
- Developer: National Instruments
- Stable release: 2010 / November 2010
- Operating system: Windows 7, Vista, XP, Server 2003, Server 2008
- Type: Data acquisition, instrument control, test automation, analysis and signal processing, industrial control, embedded design
- License: Proprietary
- Website: www.ni.com/mstudio/

NI Measurement Studio is a set of test and measurement components built by National Instruments, that integrates into the Microsoft Visual Studio environment. It includes extensive support for accessing instrumentation hardware. It has drivers and abstraction layers for many different types of instruments and buses are included or are available for inclusion.

Measurement Studio includes a suite of analysis functions, including curve fitting, spectral analysis, fast Fourier transforms (FFT) and digital filters, and visualization. It also includes the ability to share variables and pass data over the internet with network shared variables.

== History ==
Measurement Studio was introduced in February 2000 by National Instruments to combine its text-based programming tools, specifically: LabWindows/CVI, Component Works ++, Component Works.

Measurement Studio 7.0 adopted support for .NET and allowed for native .NET controls and classes to integrate into Visual Studio. As of Measurement Studio 8.0.1, support for Visual Studio 2005 and .NET 2.0 framework have been included, with support for Windows Vista first adopted in version 8.1.1. Current version of Measurement Studio drops support for multiple versions of Visual Studio including 2008, 2005, .NET 2003 and 6.0.

Measurement Studio includes a variety of examples, to illustrate how common GPIB, VISA, DAQMX, analysis, and DataSocket applications can be accessed.

== Related software ==
National Instruments also offers a product called LabVIEW, which offers many of the test, measurement and control capabilities of Measurement Studio. National Instruments also offers LabWindows/CVI. as an alternative for ANSI C programmers.

== See also ==
- Dataflow programming
- Virtual instrumentation
- Fourth-generation programming language
