= Myrio =

Myrio or MyRIO may refer to:

- MyRIO, an embedded processor board from National Semiconductor
- Myrio, or Myria-, a now obsolete decimal metric prefix denoting a factor of 10^{4}
