= OpenWire (library) =

- OpenWire graphical editor installed in Delphi XE3
- Developer: Boian Mitov
- Initial release: August 31, 2001; 24 years ago
- Stable release: 8.0.0.142 / March 26, 2025; 9 months ago
- Written in: Delphi
- Operating system: Windows, Android, macOS, iOS, Linux
- Platform: Hardware: IA-32, x64 and ARM; Software: VCL and FireMonkey
- Size: 712 MB
- Type: Libraries
- License: Free and open-source, requires attribution
- Website: www.openwire.org

OpenWire is an open-source dataflow programming library that extends the functionality of Embarcadero Delphi and C++ Builder by providing pin type component properties. The properties can be connected to each other. The connections can be used to deliver data or state information between the pins, simulating the functionality of LabVIEW, Agilent VEE and Simulink. OpenWire is available for Visual Component Library (VCL) and FireMonkey (FMX).

== History ==
The project started in 1997 as an attempt for visual design of text parsers. Later it was used for designing signal processing libraries, and was expanded to support any data type.

== Pins ==
Pins form the connections between the components. OpenWire defines 4 types of pins:

- SourcePin usually provides data. Can connect to one or more SinkPins and to one StatePin.
- SinkPin usually receives data. Can be connected to one SourcePin.
- MultiSinkPin usually receives data. Can be connected to one or more SourcePin.
- StatePin usually is used to share state between components. Can be connected to one or more StatePins or SinkPins, and to one SourcePin.

== Pin Lists ==
Pin lists can contain and group pins. OpenWire defines 2 types of pin lists:

- PinList contains pins but is not responsible to create or destroy them.
- PinListOwner contains pins and is responsible to create or destroy them.

== Data Types ==
Two pins in OpenWire can connect and exchange data only if they support compatible data types. Each pin can support one or more data types. The data types are distinguished by GUID unique for each data type.

== Format Converters ==
The latest version of OpenWire supports automatic data conversion. If two pins can't connect directly due to incompatible data types, a data format converter can be used automatically to convert the data between the pins. The developers can create and register format converters associated with different data types.

== Multi-threading ==
OpenWire is designed as thread-safe and well suited for multi-threading VCL and FireMonkey component development.

== Version history ==
The following is a rough outline of product release information.

Date	Version	Significant changes
August 31, 2001	1.2	Official release.
September 4, 2001	1.3	Small fixes.
November 21, 2001	1.4	Minor changes.
February 16, 2002	1.5	Improved multiple data type per pin support.
February 23, 2002	1.6	Delphi 6.0 Support.
April 14, 2002	1.7	C++ Builder 6.0 Support.
May 9, 2002	1.8	Improved and cleanup release.
April 13, 2003	2.0	Added StatePin and dispatchers support.
May 15, 2003	2.1	Maintenance release.
August 27, 2003	2.2	Maintenance release.
January 3, 2004	2.3	Complex data type added.
December 2, 2004	2.4	Added multithreading support. Delphi 2005 support.
June 22, 2005	2.5	Improved Multithreading.
February 22, 2006	2.6	Minor improvements.
January 4, 2007	3.0	Added support for add on editors(Graphical).
October 25, 2007	3.1	Fixed loading from Frames.
March 14, 2009	4.0	Added Format Converters. Added Lazarus support for Windows, and Linux.
September 23, 2009	4.3	Added Delphi and C++ Builder 2010 support.
May 7, 2010	4.5	Added TOWMultiSinkPins.
September 2, 2011	5.0	Added Delphi and C++ Builder XE, XE2 and FireMonkey support. 64 bit compatible.
October 1, 2011	5.0.1	Maintenance release.
October 11, 2012	5.0.3	Added Delphi and C++ Builder XE3 support. Added initial MAC support.
June 12, 2013	6.0	Added Delphi and C++ Builder XE4 support. Dropped support for versions older than Delphi and C++ Builder XE2. Dropped Lazarus support due to lack of language features.
April 13, 2014	7.0	Added Delphi and C++ Builder XE5 and XE6 support. Dropped support for versions older than Delphi and C++ Builder XE3. Added Android support.
November 13, 2014	7.5	Added Delphi and C++ Builder XE7 support. Dropped support for versions older than Delphi and C++ Builder XE4. Redesigned to use the new free Mitov.Runtime library which significantly reduces the code.
April 12, 2015	7.6	Added Delphi and C++ Builder XE8, and XE8 support Dropped support for versions older than Delphi and C++ Builder XE4.
October 26, 2015	7.7	Added Delphi and C++ Builder 10 Seattle support
May 1, 2016	7.8	Added Delphi and C++ Builder 10.1 Berlin support
December 21, 2018	7.8.2	Added Delphi and C++ Builder 10.2 support
April 28, 2021	8.0.0	Added Delphi and C++ Builder 10.3 and 10.4 support
October 11, 2021	8.0.0.36	Added Delphi and C++ Builder 11.0 Alexandria support
December 6, 2023	8.0.0.101	Added Delphi and C++ Builder 12.0 Athens support
March 26, 2025	8.0.0.142	Added Delphi and C++ Builder 12.3 Athens support

== Future development ==
A graphical OpenWire editor is under development. The latest version of the editor is available from the OpenWire Homepage.
