= MyRIO =

- Manufacturer: National Instruments
- Available: In production
- Website: www.ni.com/myrio

MyRIO is a real-time embedded evaluation board made by National Instruments. It is used to develop applications that utilize its onboard FPGA and microprocessor. It requires LabVIEW. It's geared towards students and basic applications.

== Specifications ==
(for myRIO-1900)

- Xilinx Z-7010 processor 667 MHz (ARM Cortex A9 x2 cores 28 nm process NEON SIMD, VFPv3 Vector Float)
- Memory: NV: 256 MB, DDR3 512MB, 533 MHz, 16 bits
- FPGA type same as processor
- Wireless: IEEE 802.11 b,g,n ISM 2.4 GHz 20 MHz.
- USB 2.0 Hi-Speed
- Breakout Board support
- 2 ports of 16 Digital I/O lines
- 3 axis accelerometer
- Max power consumption : 14 W
- Typical idle : 2.6 W
- LED's

== Similar products ==
cRIO (compactRIO) myDAQ
