= Epostmailer =

Spryka ePostMailer
- Developer: Khurram Zaveri
- Stable release: 4.1 / April 10, 2009; 17 years ago
- Written in: Delphi
- Operating system: Microsoft Windows
- Type: Email Marketing
- Website: ePostMailer.com

ePostMailer is a Microsoft Windows based email marketing application created in CodeGear Delphi by Khurram Zaveri of Spryka Incorporated. It was formerly known as Sprika LiteMail. The first version was released in 1997.

== Description ==
The first version of LiteMail was created in Visual Basic 6. Subsequent versions have since been written in Object Pascal. LiteMail 3.1 was reviewed by Heinz Tschabitscher, the About.com guide to email. ePostMailer 4.1 has been reviewed by James Fagbire of FreeDownloadsCenter.com and Kathy Yakal of PC Magazine.

LiteMail was renamed as ePostMailer after conflicts with an application developed by CMF Perception
