= TOMVIEW =

- Developer(s): Tomlab Optimization Inc.
- Stable release: 2.1 / 26 Mars 2007
- Written in: LabVIEW 7 and 8 (FORTRAN, C)
- Operating system: Windows 32+bit
- Size: 27 MB (Windows)
- Type: Technical computing
- License: Proprietary
- Website: TOMVIEW product page

The TOMVIEW Optimization Environment is a platform for solving applied optimization problems in LabVIEW.

== Description ==
TOMVIEW is a general purpose development environment in LabVIEW for research, teaching and practical solution of optimization problems. It enables a wider range of problems to be solved in LabVIEW and provides many proprietary solvers.
