= General Security Service =

General Security Service may refer to the following:

- General Security Service (Syria)
- Shin Bet
- Palestinian Civil Police Force

== See also ==
- General Security Directorate (disambiguation)
- General Intelligence Service (disambiguation)
