= CompactRIO =

Embedded industrial controller

- Manufacturer: National Instruments
- Available: In production
- Website: www.ni.com/compactrio

CompactRIO (or cRIO) is a real-time embedded industrial controller made by National Instruments for industrial control systems. The CompactRIO is a combination of a real-time controller, reconfigurable IO Modules (RIO), FPGA module and an Ethernet expansion chassis.

== Hardware ==
The CompactRIO system is a combination of a real-time controller chassis, reconfigurable IO Modules (RIO), an FPGA module and an Ethernet expansion chassis. Third-party modules are also available, and are generally compatible with NI-produced chassis controllers.

CompactRIO real-time controllers include a microprocessor for implementing control algorithms, and support a wide range of clock frequencies. Controllers are only compatible with National Instruments C Series I/O Modules. I/O modules are hot swappable (can be connected/disconnected while the unit is powered up).

The FPGA Module may be used to implement high-performance data processing on reconfigurable fabric. Such data processing may be performed on data streaming in from connected I/O Modules. The module is powered by a Xilinx Virtex high-performance FPGA on the earlier models, and Kintex-7, Artix-7 or Zynq Xilinx FPGA on the newer models. The FPGA can be programmed separately and is connected to the real-time controller using an internal PCI bus, and is accessible over a LabVIEW interface which operates both locally on the controller as well as over a LAN from LabVIEW on a PC.

The Ethernet chassis includes an Ethernet port (8P8C), which can connect the CompactRIO controller to a PC. The chassis is available in 4 slot and 8 slot varieties.

Third-party modules are manufactured for additional features, such as LCD or VGA displays. Newer, high-performance CompactRIO controllers also have built-in VGA graphics which can be connected to a monitor for observing operation.

== Software ==
CompactRIO controllers can be programmed with LabVIEW, National Instruments' graphical programming language; C; C++; or Java. LabVIEW must be used to program the embedded FPGA, although VHDL and verilog components can be included.

Newer controllers come with a Linux based RTOS, NI Linux Real-Time, created as part of the Linux Foundation's Real-Time Linux Collaborative Project. Programs created in LabVIEW are compiled into machine code for NI Linux Real-Time and hardware description language (HDL) for the Xilinx FPGA toolchain automatically during deployment of the code to the target.

The Linux Real-Time OS running in the real-time controller supports a filesystem and hence data logging is also available at the controller level. The Full Development System version of LabVIEW does not come with the modules needed to program the cRIO. The Real-Time Module and FPGA Modules have to be purchased separately and installed with LabVIEW for programming the hardware. The programming is done on a Host PC running the Windows operating system and is deployed on the cRIO via Ethernet.

It is not necessary to run a real-time VI on the controller in order to run the FPGA VI, as the LabVIEW FPGA interface is network capable, supporting up to 7 concurrent accessors. This is done with a connection URL like RIO://ip/RIO0

Do note that the read/write interface block appears to package multiple accessors into one, but actually loops with a round-trip delay per additional access added, which can very quickly add up. This can be worked around by grouping all controls into one cluster, and all displays into another, for each write/read access, and for each accessor. It is possible to have a local real-time VI running on the controller which concurrently accesses a different set of clusters without interference, and piping data from one cluster to another can allow data to flow between this real-time VI and a PC VI efficiently and with quite low latency.

Data can also be piped though 'FPGA to HOST' and 'HOST to FPGA' DMA fifos, which also work over the network interface. Each VI having an interface, each host FIFO connection and each IRQ connection all count as accessors to the FPGA hosted by the controller. These FIFO's can typically saturate the Ethernet connection of the controller, offering good performance both in terms of bandwidth, and with careful use, latency.

The LabVIEW FPGA interface is also available for C.

== Applications ==
CompactRIO systems are often used as an industrial control unit, where a small form factor are important.

CompactRIO is commonly used as headless systems (without a user interface) which are designed to run in a confined space, under harsh conditions. CompactRIO systems can also be connected to a host PC which can be used for supervisory purposes and for displaying logged data.

Other examples of applications areas are: Intelligent Systems for the Industrial Internet of Things (IIoT), Power Electronics and Inverter Control, Condition Monitoring of Rotating Equipment, Power Quality Monitoring, Transportation and Heavy Equipment, and Laser or Hydraulic Control.

The CompactRIO was used from 2009 until 2015 as the primary control unit in the FIRST Robotics Competition. It has been replaced now by the National Instruments roboRIO.

== See also ==
- CompactDAQ
- roboRIO
