= GSDS =

GSDS may refer to:

- Golden Sun: Dark Dawn, a series of fantasy role-playing video games
- Gold Stealing Detective Squad, a special unit of the Western Australian Police
- German Sustainable Development Strategy (German: Deutsche Nachhaltigkeitsstrategie), a policy document outlining the goals, indicators, and measures of the German government to promote sustainable development

== See also ==
- GSD (disambiguation)
