= General Intelligence Service =

General Intelligence Service is an intelligence agency that can refer to:

- General Intelligence Service (Egypt) – Egyptian intelligence agency
- General Intelligence Service (Palestine) – Palestinian intelligence agency
- General Intelligence Service (Sudan) – Sudanese federal agency
- General Intelligence Service (Syria) – Syrian intelligence agency

== See also ==
- General Security Service (disambiguation)
