= NI Ultiboard =

Electronic PCB layout design software

- Screenshots of an NI Ultiboard project in 2D and 3D views. Above: PCB editor and plot view tools and panels. Below: 3D mode with components and tracks visible.
- Developer: National Instruments Electronics Workbench Group (formerly by Interactive Image Technologies)
- Stable release: 13.0.1 / April 9, 2014; 12 years ago
- Operating system: Microsoft Windows
- Available in: English
- Type: Electronic design automation
- License: Proprietary EULA
- Website: www.ni.com/ultiboard

NI Ultiboard, formerly ULTIboard, is an electronic printed circuit board (PCB) layout program which is part of a suite of circuit design programs, along with NI Multisim. It is used for customising hardware components. One of its major features is the real time design rule check, a feature that was only offered on expensive work stations in the days when it was introduced. ULTIboard was originally created by a company named Ultimate Technology, which is now a subsidiary of National Instruments. Ultiboard includes a 3D PCB viewing mode, integrated import and export features to the schematic capture, and simulation software in the suite, Multisim.

== History ==
=== Market penetration ===
ULTIboard was originally created by Ultimate Technology in Naarden, Netherlands. It sold for $800–$2500, depending on the design size chosen.

Student versions that were offered for very low prices were limited; they could not produce photo plot files. They also contributed to the popularity of the software as most students knew how to work with the program.

Ultimate Technology's managing director, James Post, was known for his innovative marketing approach and customer oriented thinking. In 1989, they distributed 180,000 free demonstration floppy disks (demo-discs) via electronics magazines, a first in history. Soon thereafter, ULTIboard became market leader in Europe in the field of PC based PCB design products.

The company held worldwide user meetings where customers could attend free and even got a free gourmet lunch. Optionally, customers could take an afternoon training to get up and running with the latest features. Priced at US$75, most users took this option. Other PR activities included invitations for customers to have a lunch during trade shows and conferences, boat rides, cart racing, flying for their best accounts. This strategy helped ULTIboard to become the leader in customer loyalty.

=== Rebranding ===
In 1999, Ultimate Technology merged with Interactive Image Technologies and eventually renamed itself to Electronics Workbench. In 2003, all development of ULTIboard was moved to the head office in Toronto.

Ultiboard is now supported and distributed by National Instruments. The product has been renamed from Electronics Workbench back to Ultiboard with the schematic capture and simulation tool named Multisim.

== See also ==
- Comparison of EDA software
- List of free electronics circuit simulators
- NI Multisim, schematic capture and simulation software integrated with Ultiboard
- OrCAD, an Ultiboard competitor
