= TestStand =

- Developer(s): National Instruments
- Type: Test management software
- License: Proprietary
- Website: www.ni.com/teststand/

TestStand is a test management software suite from National Instruments.

TestStand is used to develop test software for products which are produced by an enterprise. The test station has a similar appearance to test personnel across the product line. TestStand provides features that might reduce software development time by avoiding the need to develop these features. Some of the features that it provides are reports and logging. Test software developers can use multiple languages to develop software using TestStand.
