= Genetic significant dose =

Genetic significant dose (GSD), or genetically significant dose, was initially defined by United Nations Scientific Committee on the Effects of Atomic Radiation (UNSCEAR) in 1958.

It represents an estimate of the genetic significance of gonad radiation doses. Annual GSD is calculated by weighting the individual gonad doses received during ionizing imaging by the number of individual examined, and accounting for the number of offspring for each individual.
