= NI Multisim =

Electronic Software

- A screenshot of NI Multisim simulating a circuit, with schematic capture and virtual instrument tools visible.
- Developer: National Instruments Electronics Workbench Group (formerly by Interactive Image Technologies)
- Stable release: 14.3 / 2022/04/28
- Operating system: Microsoft Windows
- Size: ~260mb
- Available in: English
- Type: Electronic design automation
- License: Proprietary EULA
- Website: www.multisim.com

NI Multisim (formerly MultiSIM) is an electronic schematic capture and simulation program which is part of a suite of circuit design programs, along with NI Ultiboard. Multisim is one of the few circuit design programs to employ the original Berkeley SPICE based software simulation. Multisim was originally created by a company named Electronics Workbench Group, which is now a division of National Instruments. Multisim includes microcontroller simulation (formerly known as MultiMCU), as well as integrated import and export features to the printed circuit board layout software in the suite, NI Ultiboard.

Multisim is widely used in academia and industry for circuits education, electronic schematic design and SPICE simulation.

== History ==
Multisim was originally called Electronics Workbench and created by a company called Interactive Image Technologies. At the time it was mainly used as an educational tool to teach electronics technician and electronics engineering programs in colleges and universities. National Instruments has maintained this educational legacy, with a specific version of Multisim with features developed for teaching electronics.

In 1999, Multisim was integrated with Ultiboard after the original company merged with Ultimate Technology, a PCB layout software company.

In 2005, Interactive Image Technologies was acquired by National Instruments Electronics Workbench Group and Multisim was renamed to NI Multisim.

== Pricing ==
Edition	Price
Power Pro	$4591
Full	$2800
Base	$1773
Education	$628

== See also ==
- Comparison of EDA software
- List of free electronics circuit simulators
- Proteus Design Suite
- Qucs
- NI Ultiboard, the PCB layout software that is integrated with Multisim.
- OrCAD
