= LabWindows/CVI =

ANSI C programming environment

- Developer: National Instruments
- Initial release: January 1989; 37 years ago
- Stable release: 2020 f3 / February 2023; 3 years ago
- Operating system: Windows 11/10/8.1/7 SP1; Linux run-time support and Pharlap real-time run-time support
- Type: Data acquisition, instrument control, test automation, analysis and signal processing
- Website: ni.com/cvi

LabWindows/CVI (CVI is short for C for Virtual Instrumentation) is an ANSI C programming environment for test and measurement developed by National Instruments. The program was originally released as LabWindows for DOS in 1987, but was soon revisioned (and renamed) for the Microsoft Windows platform. The current version of LabWindows/CVI (commonly referred to as CVI) is 2020.

LabWindows/CVI uses the same libraries and data-acquisition modules as the better known National Instrument product LabVIEW and is thus highly compatible with it.

LabVIEW is targeted more at domain experts and scientists, and CVI more towards software engineers that are more comfortable with text-based linear languages such as C.

== Release history ==
Starting with LabWindows/CVI 8.0, major versions are released around the first week of August, to coincide with the annual National Instruments conference NI Week, and followed by a bug-fix release the following February.

In 2009, National Instruments started to name the releases after the year in which they are released. The bugfix is called a Service Pack (for instance, the 2009 Service Pack 1 release was published in February 2010).

In October 2025, National Instruments officially announced plans to revive LabWindows/CVI with a new release tentatively named 2026 Q3, via a posting from NI employees to the LabWindows/CVI forum.

Name/version	Build number	Date	Operating system support and notes
The LabWindows/CVI project begins		1987	
LabWindows/CVI 1.0		Jan 1989	DOS
LabWindows/CVI 2.0		Apr 1991	DOS. GUI Tools and Memory Extender
LabWindows/CVI 3.0		Mar 1994	DOS, Windows 3.1, and Solaris
LabWindows/CVI 3.1		Jul 1995	generate codes automatically
LabWindows/CVI 3.1.1		1995	first release with "application builder" capability
LabWindows/CVI 4.0		May 1996	External C/C++ compiler compatibility
LabWindows/CVI 4.0.1		Aug 1996	
LabWindows/CVI 5.0		Feb 1998	support for VXI and IVI
LabWindows/CVI 5.5		Feb 2000	Multithreaded libraries, debugging
LabWindows/CVI 6.0		Oct 2001	ActiveX support, improved presentation
LabWindows/CVI 7.0		Jul 2003	use Workspace
LabWindows/CVI 7.1		Sep 2004	completion automatically
LabWindows/CVI 8.0		Oct 2005	support for .NET assemblies
LabWindows/CVI 8.0.1			
LabWindows/CVI 8.1		2006	
LabWindows/CVI 8.1.1			
LabWindows/CVI 8.5		2007	
LabWindows/CVI 8.5.1			
LabWindows/CVI 9.0		2008	ANSI C99 support
LabWindows/CVI 9.0.1			
LabWindows/CVI 2009	9.1	2009	create 64-bit applications
LabWindows/CVI 2009 SP1			
LabWindows/CVI 2010	10.0	2010	Linux support
LabWindows/CVI 2010 SP1			
LabWindows/CVI 2012	12.0	2012	
LabWindows/CVI 2012 SP1			
LabWindows/CVI 2013	13.0	2013	Changed compiler to Clang 2.9. New debugger running in its own process.
LabWindows/CVI 2013 SP1			
LabWindows/CVI 2013 SP2			
LabWindows/CVI 2015	15.0	2015	upgrade to Clang 3.3
LabWindows/CVI 2015 SP1	15.1	2016	
LabWindows/CVI 2017	17.0	2017	Tracepoints, word/semantic highlighting, thread-specific breakpoints, comment/uncomment
LabWindows/CVI 2019	19.0	May 2019	Updates to Source Code Editor: zooming, code snippets, multi-line edits
LabWindows/CVI 2020	20.0	Sep 2020	UTF-8 support
LabWindows/CVI 2020 f3	20.0	Feb 2023	Windows 11 support

== See also ==
- National Instruments
