= General Security Directorate =

General Security Directorate or variants may refer to:

- General Directorate of Security (India), an Indian intelligence agency
- General Directorate of Security (Portugal) (Direção-Geral de Segurança)
- General Directorate of Security (Spain) (Dirección General de Seguridad)
- General Directorate of Security (Turkey) (Emniyet Genel Müdürlüğü)
- General Directorate of Public Security, Saudi Arabia
- General Security Directorate (Iraq), (Mudiriyat al-Amn al-Amma)
  - Directorate of General Security, Iraqi secret police dissolved in 2003
- General Security Directorate (Lebanon), (Sûreté générale)
- General Security Directorate (Syria), (Idarat al-Amn al-'Amm)

== See also ==
- General Security Service (disambiguation)
- Directorate-General for Human Resources and Security of the European Commission
