= Synthetic measure =

Metric combined from other metrics

A synthetic measure (or synthetic indicator) is a value that is the result of combining other metrics, which are measurements of various features.

== Examples ==
=== Quality of service ===
There is a method to measure quality of service in hotels. In related study authors aggregate tourist opinions, measured on a scale from 1 to 10. Synthetic measure (indicator) of service quality in each hotel is calculated with the help of the aggregation operator.

=== Project performance ===
Other study proposed to use classical parameters EV, PV and AC to carry out the synthetic measure of project performance.

=== Rankings of countries ===
Different normalized stimulants and destimulants were used in research to create synthetic measure that selects countries with the best and the worst levels of implementation of Europe 2020 targets.
