= General Staff Department =

General Staff Department may refer to:

- General Staff Department of the Korean People's Army
- People's Liberation Army General Staff Department now the Joint Staff Department (China)
