= Code Insight =

Code Insight is the name several software vendors (such as Borland, Embarcadero and Oracle) use for source code autocompletion, similar to Microsoft's IntelliSense. Code Insight can also refer to source code analysis information such as annotation or revision history provided by tools like Atlassian FishEye.
