= Virtual instrumentation =

Virtual instrumentation is the use of customizable software and modular measurement hardware to create user-defined measurement systems.

== Overview ==
Traditional hardware instrumentation systems are made up of fixed hardware components, such as digital multimeters and oscilloscopes that are completely specific to their stimulus, analysis, or measurement function. Because of their hard-coded function, these systems are more limited in their versatility than virtual instrumentation systems. The primary difference between hardware instrumentation and virtual instrumentation is that software is used to replace a large amount of hardware. The software enables complex and expensive hardware to be replaced by already purchased computer hardware; e. g. analog-to-digital converter can act as a hardware complement of a virtual oscilloscope, a potentiostat enables frequency response acquisition and analysis in electrochemical impedance spectroscopy with virtual instrumentation.

The concept of a synthetic instrument is a subset of the virtual instrumentation concept. A synthetic instrument is a kind of virtual instrumentation that is purely software defined. A synthetic instrument performs a specific synthesis, analysis, or measurement function on completely generic, measurement agnostic hardware. Virtual instrumentation can still have measurement-specific hardware, and tend to emphasize modular hardware approaches that facilitate this specificity. Hardware supporting synthetic instrumentation is by definition not specific to the measurement, nor is it necessarily (or usually) modular.

Leveraging commercially available technologies, such as the PC and the analog-to-digital converter, virtual instrumentation has grown significantly since its inception in the late 1970s. Additionally, software packages like National Instruments' LabVIEW and other graphical programming languages helped grow adoption by making it easier for non-programmers to develop systems.

The newly updated technology called "hard virtual instrumentation" is developed by some companies. It is said that with this technology the execution of the software is done by the hardware itself which can help in fast real time processing.

== See also ==
- Measuring instrument
