= National Instruments =

American multinational company

National Instruments Corporation

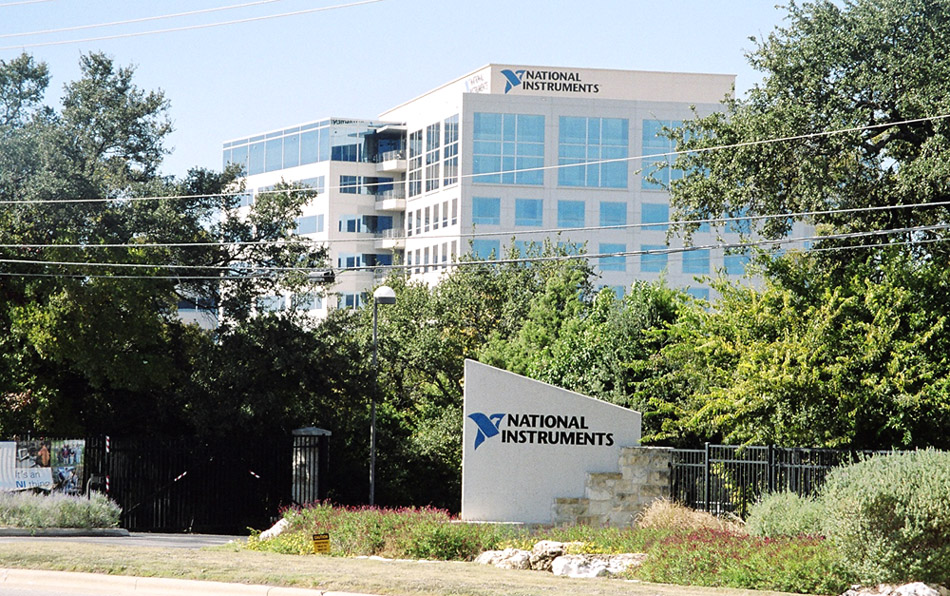
- National Instruments campus in Austin, Texas
- Type: Division
- Founded: 1976; 50 years ago
- Founders: James Truchard; Bill Nowlin; Jeff Kodosky
- Headquarters: Austin, Texas, Austin, United States
- Key people: Ritu Favre (President)
- Products: LabWindows/CVI; LabVIEW; PXI; DAQ; cRIO; TestStand; roboRIO
- Revenue: ▲US$1.66 billion (2022)
- Operating income: ▲US$192 million (2022)
- Net income: ▲US$140 million (2022)
- Total assets: ▲US$2.36 billion (2022)
- Total equity: ▼US$1.16 billion (2022)
- Number of employees: c. 7,000 (Dec. 2022)
- Parent: Emerson
- Website: ni.com

The NI, formerly the National Instruments Corporation, is an American multinational company headquartered in Austin, Texas. NI is the producer of automated test equipment, semiconductor production equipment, and virtual instrumentation software. Following its acquisition by Emerson Electric in October 2023, NI has operated as Emerson’s test and measurement business unit.

In 2022, NI sold products to more than 35,000 companies worldwide, generating $1.66 billion USD in revenue.

== History ==
=== Foundation ===
1970s

In the early 1970s, James Truchard, Jeff Kodosky, and Bill Nowlin worked at the University of Texas at Austin Applied Research Laboratories. While working on a project for the U.S. Navy, they used emerging computer technology to collect and analyze data. The group sought to develop a GPIB interface for the PDP-11/04 minicomputer. In 1976, they founded a company in Truchard's garage. They initially attempted to incorporate under names such as Longhorn Instruments and Texas Digital, but trademarks of these names were rejected. Ultimately, they established the name National Instruments.

With a $10,000 loan from Interfirst Bank, the group purchased a PDP-11/04 minicomputer and commenced their first project by designing and building a GPIB interface for it. Their first sale was to Kelly Air Force Base in San Antonio. At that time, the three founders were still employed at the University of Texas.

In 1977, the company employed its first full-time staff member, Kim Harrison-Hosen. By that time, it had sold a limited number of products. The company produced and distributed a mailer to 15,000 users of the PDP-11 minicomputer. As sales began to rise, it relocated to a dedicated office space, occupying a 600-square-foot office at 9513 Burnet Road in Austin. Later, the company booked $400,000 in orders, recording a $60,000 profit.

=== 1980s ===
In 1980, Truchard, Kodosky, and Nowlin resigned from their positions to devote themselves full-time to NI. Soon afterwards, they moved the company to a larger office, renting 5,000 square feet (500 m^{2}) of office space. To assist in generating revenue, the company undertook numerous projects, including a fuel-pump credit-card system and a waveform generator for U.S. Navy sonar acoustic testing. In 1981, the company reached the $1 million sales mark, leading them to move to a 10,000-square-foot (1,000 m^{2}) office in 1982.

In 1983, NI developed its first GPIB board to connect instruments to IBM PCs. With the arrival of the Macintosh computer, Kodosky began a research initiative with the assistance of student researchers at the University of Texas into ways to utilize the new interface. This led to the creation of NI's flagship product, the LabVIEW graphical development platform for the Macintosh computer, which was released in 1986. The software allows engineers and scientists to program graphically by "wiring" icons together instead of typing text-based code. The following year, a version of LabVIEW, known as LabWindows, was released for the DOS environment.

By 1986, the company had 100 employees. NI opened its first international branch in Tokyo the following year.

=== 1990s ===
Logo used from 1995 to 2020

After outgrowing its rented space, NI relocated to a new building at 6504 Bridge Point Parkway in 1990, which the company purchased in 1991. That building, located along Lake Austin near the Loop 360 Bridge, became known as "Silicon Hills Bridge Point."

NI received its first patent for LabVIEW in 1991. Later that same year, they introduced Signal Conditioning Extensions for Instrumentation (SCXI) to expand the signal-processing capabilities of the PC, and in 1992, LabVIEW was first released for Windows-based PCs and Unix workstations. NI also created the National Instruments Alliance Partner program. (NIAP) In 1993, the company reached the milestone of $100 million in annual sales. In late 1993, NI released LabWindows/CVI for C/C++ programmers.. The following year, an employee began experiments with the relatively new World Wide Web and developed natinst.com, the company's very first web page.

The company began to run out of room on its approximately 136,000-square-foot (12,600 m^{2}) campus. In 1994, NI broke ground on a new campus, located at a 72-acre (290,000 m^{2}) site along North Mopac Boulevard in northern Austin. By this time, NI had reached 1,000 employees. The new NI campus, which opened in 1998, contains dedicated "play" areas, including basketball and volleyball courts, an employee gym, and a campus-wide walking trail. Each of the buildings on the campus is lined with windows and features an open floor plan. Employees had been granted stock in the privately held company as part of their compensation packages. When NI went public in 1995, over 300 current and former employees owned stock. The company was listed on the Nasdaq exchange as NATI.

By the late 1990s, the company provided more advanced DAQ boards that could replace vendor-defined instruments with a custom PC-based system. With the company's acquisition of Georgetown Systems Lookout software, NI products were further incorporated into applications run on the factory floor. By 1996, the company had reached $200 million in annual sales and was named to Forbes magazine's 200 Best Small Companies list. NI would later release machine vision software and hardware. NI also introduced the CompactPCI-based PXI, an open industry standard for modular measurement and automation, and NI TestStand, which provides for tracking high-volume manufacturing tests.

=== 2000s ===
Following the acquisition of the ni.com domain, the company launched the NI Developer Zone. The platform provides developers with access to example programs, sample code, and development tips, as well as community forums for users and employees.

In the 2000s, NI began exporting most of its manufacturing overseas by opening its 144,000-square-foot (13,400 m^{2}) manufacturing plant in Debrecen, Hungary. NI now manufactures nearly 90% of its production in Debrecen and has expanded several times in the last decade. With a multi-million dollar grant from the government, NI increased production in Debrecen by approximately 20%. With new automation processes, headcount increased by only 2%. In 2002, the company dedicated the 379,000-square-foot (35,200 m^{2}) Building C on its Mopac campus, which became the headquarters for the company's R&D operations. The completion of this building allowed NI to move all Austin-based employees to a single location.

The primary company model used was business-to-consumer (B2C). By 2006, NI had opened 21 sales offices in Europe, 12 in the Asia/Pacific region, and additional offices in the Americas, Africa, and the Middle East. Research and Development centers are located in the United States, Germany, India, Romania, China, Canada, and Malaysia.

In 2005, NI acquired Measurement Computing, a provider of low-cost data acquisition products.

=== 2010s ===
In January 2013, NI acquired all outstanding shares of Digilent Inc., which became a wholly owned subsidiary. Two Washington State University electrical engineering professors, Clint Cole and Gene Apperson, founded Digilent in 2000. Digilent grew to become a multinational corporation with sales of test and development products to universities. Digilent developed the open standard Pmod Interface.

=== 2020s ===
On June 16, 2020, the company announced an official name change to "NI". On May 4, 2021, NI announced the acquisition of monoDrive, a provider of simulation software for advanced driver-assistance systems (ADAS) and autonomous vehicle development. In March 2022, it was announced that NI had completed the acquisition of Heinzinger Automotive GmbH, the electronic vehicle systems business of Rosenheim-based Heinzinger Electronic GmbH.

After months of failed negotiations to purchase NI, industrial conglomerate Emerson Electric launched a hostile takeover bid in early 2023, appealing directly to shareholders. In April 2023, NI agreed to be purchased for $8.2 billion in an all-cash deal. which was completed in October 2023. Within Emerson, NI now operates as the Test & Measurement business group, headquartered in Austin, Texas.

== Products ==
NI's engineering software includes:

- LabVIEW, a graphical development environment
- LabVIEW Communications System Design Suite, for rapid deployment of communication systems
- LabWindows/CVI, an ANSI C programming environment
- Measurement Studio, a set of components for Microsoft Visual Studio
- NI TestStand, for test execution sequencing
- NI VeriStand, for real-time test
- NI DIAdem, for data management
- NI Multisim, for circuit design
- NI Ultiboard, for PCB design
- NI Vision Builder, for automated Inspection
- NI LabVIEW SignalExpress, for data logging
- NI Switch Executive, for switch management
- NI Requirements Gateway, for requirements tracking

NI's hardware platforms include:

- NI CompactRIO, programmable FPGA-based industrial controller
- NI roboRIO, a robotics controller used standard in the FIRST Robotics Competition
- NI CompactDAQ, data acquisition systems for USB and Ethernet
- PXI and PXIe Platforms, a modular instrumentation standard with more than 1,500 products
- STS, a production-ready ATE solution for RF, mixed-signal, and MEMS
- NI ELVIS, a multi-instrument lab station for teaching technology

== Groups ==
=== Electronics Workbench Group ===
The National Instruments Electronics Workbench Group is responsible for creating the electronic circuit design software NI Multisim and NI Ultiboard, which was previously a Canada-based company that first produced MultiSIM, and integrated Ultiboard with it.

Interactive Image Technologies was founded in Toronto, Ontario, by Joe Koenig, and specializes in producing educational movies and documentaries. When the government of Ontario needed an educational tool for teaching electronics in colleges, the company created a circuit simulator called the Electronics Workbench. In 1996, Interactive Image Technologies appointed its vice president, Roy Bryant, as Chief Operating Officer to oversee the day-to-day operations of the company and to grow the company's electronic design automation (EDA) products. Bryant is credited with "overseeing the development and marketing of the company's Electronics Workbench EDA product." In 1998, the company started a strategic partnership with another electronic design automation company named Ultimate Technology from Naarden, Netherlands, who was the European market leader in printed circuit board design software, with its package Ultiboard. Like Electronics Workbench, founder James Post gained PR fame when he organized the distribution of 180,000 demo floppy disks via electronics magazines in Europe.

In 1999, the companies merged and renamed themselves after their most well-known product, Electronics Workbench. The product line then consisted of schematic capture software, the MultiSIM simulation program, and the printed circuit board design tool, Ultiboard.

In 2005, the company was acquired by NI and rebranded as National Instruments Electronics Workbench Group.

== Community ==
NI has held an annual developer conference, NI Week, since 1995. The week-long event is hosted at the Austin Convention Center in Austin, Texas, and features presentations by NI employees and outside speakers. An exhibition hall allows selected industry integrators and suppliers to showcase their products, while customers and university students present papers on their work with NI tools.

== See also ==
- List of companies based in Austin, Texas
- Mechatronics
