= Borland Sidekick =

Personal information manager for DOS

- Sidekick Plus 1.0 for MS-DOS
- Developers: Borland, Starfish Software, Motorola, Nokia
- Release: 1984; 42 years ago
- Stable release: 99 (9.x)
- Operating system: MS-DOS, Microsoft Windows, IBM OS/2, Apple Macintosh
- Type: Personal information manager

Borland Sidekick was a personal information manager (PIM) launched by American software company Borland in 1984 under Philippe Kahn's leadership. It was an early and popular terminate-and-stay-resident program (TSR) for MS-DOS which enabled computer users to activate the program using a hot key combination (by default: Ctrl-Alt) while working in other programs. Although a text-mode program, Sidekick's window-based interface echoed that of the Apple Macintosh and anticipated the eventual look of Microsoft Windows 2.0. It included a personal calendar, text editor (with WordStar-like command interface), calculator, ASCII chart, address book, and phone dialer. According to the prospectus for Borland's initial public offering of stock to the public, Sidekick sold more than 1 million copies in its first three years.

== Origin ==
According to Philippe Kahn, Borland did not originally intend to sell Sidekick. It developed the utility to assist the small company's employees. After several months of use Borland realized that it had a sellable product.

== Versions ==
=== MS-DOS ===
==== 1.0 ====
Sidekick 1.0 included Calculator, Notepad, Appointment Calendar, Auto Dialer, ASCII Table and other tools.

==== 1.0 Plus ====
Sidekick 1.0 Plus included a broader selection of calculators (Business, Scientific, Programmer, Formula), a 9-file Notepad text editor, Appointment Book and Scheduler, a terminal communication tool and ASCII Table. In addition to variants on and enhancements to the 1.0 features, Plus included a 9-file Outliner, a file and directory manager, Clipboard, and supported Expanded Memory and a RAM disk. Control+Alt is the default shortcut to open Sidekick 1.0 Plus.

==== 1.5 ====
Sidekick 1.5 improved compatibility with graphical programs, and specifically with Lotus Symphony and Microsoft Word.

==== 2.0 ====
Sidekick 2.0 was the last MS-DOS version.

==== Traveling Sidekick ====
Traveling Sidekick included a 3-ring binder notebook with solar-powered pocket calculator, and Sidekick software.

=== Windows ===
When Philippe Kahn left Borland in 1994 to found Starfish Software, he acquired all rights to Sidekick from Borland. Starfish's co-founder Sonia Lee Kahn designed the look and feel of Sidekick 95, which was launched simultaneously with Windows 95 with great success. In 1998 Philippe Kahn and Sonia Lee Kahn sold Starfish to Motorola for $325 million in a private transaction. Starfish was later bought by Nokia who discontinued the product, with Sidekick 99 being the last version. T-Mobile USA, Inc. currently owns the Sidekick trademark portfolio.

Later versions of the program were made available for Windows, with the last versions featuring a phone dialer and syncing with Palm, Windows CE, and EPOC devices. These versions were less popular than the MS-DOS versions, largely because the Windows environment itself provided most of the original version's key features: task switching and a collection of small utilities. It did however, include a monthly/yearly calendar and a world time map showing which parts of the world are currently in daylight or darkness. Up to eight different world cities (which could be edited) were displayed above and below the map.

==== 1.0 ====
Sidekick 1.0 for Windows was developed and released by Borland before Kahn left the company. It was designed for Windows 3.1 and included Calendar, To Do List, Contacts, a communication tool and a calculator. However, most of the design and file system came from the YourWay PIM software, purchased by Borland from Prisma Software in 1993. As the November 7, 1994 Info World noted, "Despite its name, the only connection between Sidekick for Windows 1.0 and the venerable Sidekick for MS-DOS is that Borland International owns both programs. Sidekick for Windows is a combination of the calendaring code from Prisma Software Corp.'s Windows PIM YourWay (purchased by Borland last year) and a completely new interface developed by Borland."

==== 2.0 ====
Sidekick 2.0 was also developed and initially released by Borland before the move to Starfish.

New/modified features included:

- overlapping appointments in the Scheduler,
- multiple contact files in the Address Book,
- print layouts that enabled users to print to commercial day planner pages,
- View-in-View,
- Backup & Restore of user's files,
- password protection.

Sidekick Deluxe added more than 40 content files for access to online information, Dashboard 3.0 for Windows, and the "Organized for Success" video. It was distributed in CD format.

==== Sidekick 95 ====
Sidekick 95 was a Windows 95 version. Sidekick 95 Deluxe was announced in on October 17, 1995. A 10-user version was announced in February, 1996.

It included Write (a word processor with a spell check feature), EarthTime (a clock), Expense (record keeping tools), Reminder (scheduler), Phone Dialer (communication), Contact Manager and Calendar (with an added daily Almanac).

Sidekick 95 Deluxe added Dashboard 95, America Online software, 2 interactive organizational videos, over 40 useful content files called Sidekick Companions and electronic versions of the product manuals in Adobe Acrobat format.

==== Starfish Internet Sidekick ====
Calendar tools added Activity view, daylight saving time support, web link support for contact files, Contact file synchronization over Sidekick 95.

Communications tool adds caller ID, phone dialer, integration with mail software. Spell check adds auto spell check option.

Calculator supports unit conversion.

New tools include Internet Scheduler, Expense reporter. Expense reporter includes date reporting, tax calculation, drag and drop receipts between folders.

==== Sidekick 97 ====
Calendar tools added ability to create web pages from Sidekick Calendar (via WP add-on).

Address tools added drag and drop, ability to create web pages from Sidekick Cardfiles (via WP add-on).

PDA sync is supported for Palm Pilot, via separate add-on.

World Clock supports European Daylight Saving time.

Sidekick Web Publisher compatibility is added via separate add-on.

==== Sidekick 98 ====
Calendar supports vCalendar, Outlook calendars.

Address tools support Outlook calendars.

Additional supported PDA sync include Franklin REX. Sync tool can now synchronize To do, Calls, Special Days, Appointments, and Contacts.

World clock added world map, Analog or Digital clock format.

In addition, features requiring separate add-ons in Sidekick 97 are now standard.

Long time users of Sidekick 98 report no difficulties continuing to use the program through subsequent iterations of Windows, up to and including Windows 7.

==== Sidekick 99 (9.x) ====
Various tools found in Sidekick 98 are removed in this release, including dialer, back up & restore, calculator (including conversion tools, expense reporter), spell checker, web page generator, Internet scheduler. Address and calendar file format support were reduced, with Outlook support is now import-only.

Synchronization tools now support multi-point synchronization, Franklin REX PRO, PALM III PDAs.

=== OS/2 ===
Borland Sidekick 2.0 for Presentation Manager was based on Sidekick 2.0 for Windows.

=== Macintosh ===
Borland introduced a version for the Apple Macintosh in 1985. It was a product initially called MacDesk, developed by CE Software.

== Reception ==
Borland sold 400,000 copies of Sidekick by September 1985. Rating it as "Excellent" in all categories, InfoWorld stated in November 1984 that "whoever wrote this gem understands Murphy's law ... Sidekick stands in the shadows behind whatever program you are using". Noting that for programmers, the software was less expensive "and a lot handier" than a Texas Instruments hexadecimal calculator, the magazine concluded that "Sidekick is a time-saving, frustrating-saving bargain [and] is the first step to making paper and pencil obsolete". Jerry Pournelle praised Sidekick in Byte in October 1984: "Philippe Kahn ... now has a product that IBM PC users won't be able to do without. He ought to sell a zillion copies". Elsewhere in the issue, the magazine stated that Sidekick's existence "seems to point out a major drawback in quite a few integrated software packages. Why should owners of advanced, multifunction business programs that are supposedly easy to use and that claim to solve all problems be compelled to purchase a utility like Sidekick? It makes you wonder about all those advertising claims". In 1985 Pournelle selected Sidekick as one of his products of the year for the IBM PC, and said in 1987 that he would soon have to stop using a CP/M computer to write because tools like Sidekick were unavailable. BYTE in 1989 listed SideKick Plus as among the "Distinction" winners of the BYTE Awards, stating "Talk about a bang for the buck".
