= Peter Stas =

Dutch entrepreneur and author (born 1963)

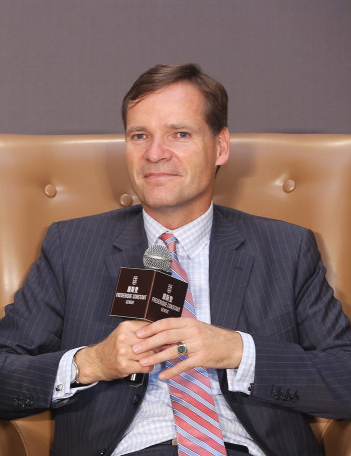
- Stas in 2013
- Born: Peter Constant Stas; June 18, 1963 (age 63); Gouda, Netherlands
- Education: Erasmus University
- Occupation: CEO of Frederique Constant
- Known for: Outspoken comments to the Swatch Group
- Spouse: Aletta Stas-Bax
- Children: Pieter-Jan Stas; Eline Stas
- Website: www.frederique-constant.com

Peter Stas (born 1963) is a Dutch entrepreneur and author who has worked in the watch industry and became known for his outspoken comments to the Swatch Group after it announced a reduction in its provision of watch component parts to third parties

== Education ==
In 1988, Stats completed his studies in Business Economics at the Erasmus University in Rotterdam.

== Career ==
After completing his studies Stas started worked as Product-Marketing Manager for Royal Philips Electronics.

He later founded, with his wife Aletta Stas-Bax, the watch company Frédérique Constant. The manufacture's initial strategy was to focus its energy on classical luxury watches at an affordable price. The Accessible Luxury positioning was the basis of strong growth during the 2008 financial crisis.

Stas played an outspoken role in a conflict with the Swatch Group after it announced a reduction in its provision of watch component parts to third parties. Stas said the proposed cuts would establish an unfair advantage and stifle competition, and not be good for the Swiss watch industry or consumer choice. A legal action to request a freeze before the Federal Administrative Court of Switzerland together with eight independent watch and movement companies to block the 2012 cuts was rejected. After a long standoff, Switzerland's Competition Commission (COMCO) finally ruled that it would not allow the Swatch Group to reduce supplies of assortments (i.e. the regulating organ of a mechanical movement: escape wheel, pallet lever, balance wheel and balance spring) that it sells to Swiss watch brands outside the group.

In 2002, to diversify the Frédérique Constant group, Stas and his wife acquired Alpina Watches, a manufacturer of Swiss sports watches founded in 1883.

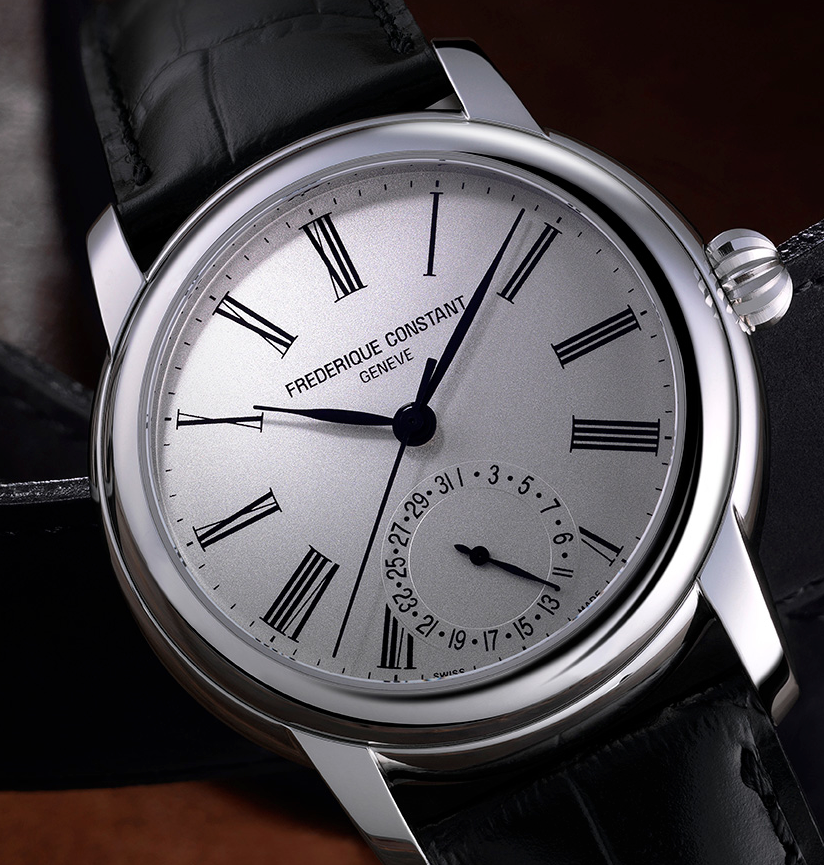
A wristwatch from Frederique Constant, the company founded by Peter Stas and wife Aletta Stas-Bax

In 2009, Stas co-founded Ateliers deMonaco, a high-end watch manufacturer based in Monaco.

In 2011, Stas did an interview with CNN as the CEO of Frédérique Constant.

In 2013, in collaboration with Aletta Stas, Gisbert L. Brunner and Alexander Linz, Peter Stas wrote the book Live your passion, Building a watch manufacture.

In 2015, Stas played a substantial role in the introduction of the "Horological Smartwatch", a smartwatch design that uses a secondary analog dial rather than a screen for its display – giving the timepiece a more classic look than other such devices. The Horological Smartwatch product line included models for both the Frédérique Constant and Alpina watch brands, and used "MotionX" core technology licensed from the California-based company Fullpower Technologies. It was developed in a joint venture known as Manufacture Modules Technologies (MMT).

In 2016, Aletta and Peter Stas sold their watch brands to Citizen, creating a high-tech collaboration in development of electronic, mechanical and hybrid calibres combining Frederique Constant's high-end Manufacture capability with Citizen's long history in revolutionary solar, radio and ultra-thin calibre innovations.

In 2018, Stas reveals the world's first mechanical smartwatch, the Frederique Constant Hybrid Manufacture that fuses smartwatch technology with a mechanical movement.
