= Frédérique Constant =

Swiss luxury watch manufacturer

Frédérique Constant SA

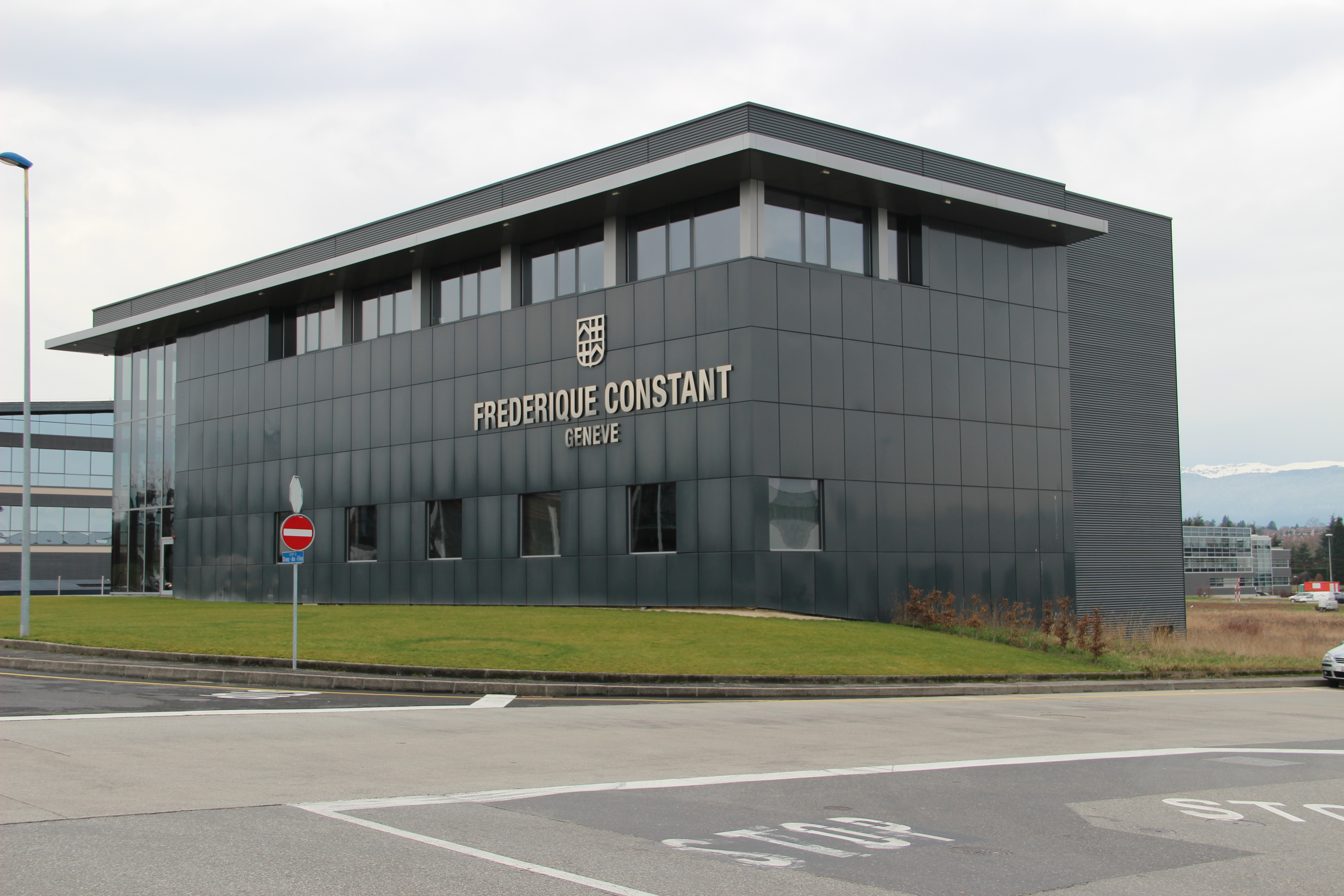
- Headquarters in Geneva, Switzerland
- Type: Subsidiary
- Industry: Watch manufacturing
- Founded: 1988; 38 years ago
- Founders: Aletta Stas; Peter Stas
- Headquarters: Geneva, Switzerland
- Key people: Niels Eggerding (Chief executive officer)
- Products: Wrist watches
- Production output: 120,000 pieces (2024)
- Revenue: ▲CHF 125 million (2023)
- Parent: Citizen Watch
- Website: frederiqueconstant.com

Frédérique Constant SA is a Swiss manufacture of luxury wristwatches based in Plan-les-Ouates, Geneva, Switzerland. Originally established in 1988 by Dutch married couple Peter Stas and Aletta Stas-Bax, it was acquired in 2016 by Citizen Watch of Tokyo, Japan.

Frédérique Constant's first watch movement, the Heart Beat Manufacture, began development in 2001 in collaboration with three other brands. The following year, the brand acquired Alpina Watches, a Swiss sports watch manufacturer that was established in 1883, and watchmaker Pim Koeslag joined the brand. Frédérique Constant has 33 manufacture (in-house) movements, as well as a mainstream line of Sellita-powered watches, including the high-end handwinding FC-910 caliber, which was introduced in 2004.

== History ==
The company was founded in 1988 by Dutch couple Aletta Francoise Frédérique Stas-Bax and Peter Constant Stas. The name originates from its founders' great-grandparents, Frédérique Schreiner (1881–1969) and Constant Stas (1880–1967), the latter of whom founded a company producing watch dials in 1904, and the brand's logo represents the Stas family crest. In 2000, the brand manufacture was in Chêne-Bourg. Watchmaker Pim Koeslag joined the brand in 2002, the same year the company acquired Alpina Watches, a manufacturer of Swiss sports watches founded in 1883, and went on to coordinate technical developments for the next two decades. In 2009, Stas, Koeslag, and Robert van Pappelendam established Ateliers deMonaco, a new brand within the Frédérique Constant group. Since 2004, Frédérique Constant has sponsored several classic car rallies worldwide, and it develops limited-edition watches for each of these sponsorships. The sponsorships have included Healey Challenges, Peking to Paris, and the Carrera Panamericana. Prior to the sale to Citizen, Union Horlogère Holding B.V. owned Ateliers deMonaco SA, a watch manufacture founded in 2008 (the same year as Frédérique Constant SA) by Peter Stas with two other partners. Frédérique Constant SA, Alpina Watches International SA, and Ateliers deMonaco SA are based in Plan-les-Ouates, Geneva, Switzerland. These companies have together been referred to as the Frédérique Constant Group.

In 2016, Peter and Aletta Stas secured the Frédérique Constant group's long-term future by accepting an leveraged buyout proposal from Japanese watchmaker Citizen Watch. The same year, the Frédérique Constant Group acquired its main distributors, including its largest market, Macher SA in Switzerland, founded in 2002 by Alexis Gouten. Subsequently, Niels Eggerding, who joined Frédérique Constant in 2012, was appointed chief executive officer of the Frédérique Constant Group in 2018. Frédérique Constant currently operates a manufacture in Geneva in a four floor 3200m^{2} building, which was expanded to 6200m^{2} in 2018.

== Products and product features ==
=== Heart Beat movement ===
In 2001, Frédérique Constant began the development of its first watch movement in cooperation with the École d'Horlogerie de Genève, École d'Ingenieurs de Genève and the Horloge Vakschool Zadkine. The Heart Beat Manufacture has a characteristic bridge for the balance wheel on the front side of the movement. Having the bridge for the balance wheel on the front side made it possible to have the spiral and fine regulation on the front side as well, creating the company's "Heart Beat" design. The company patented this construction as an innovation in watch design technology. The company's "Heart Beat Manufacture" won the "Watch of the Year" Award of Horloges Magazine in the category of up to €3000 in 2005.

As of 2014, the company has brought 15 distinct movements to the market, starting with the introduction of its original Heart Beat in 2004.

=== Silicon escapement wheel and tourbillon ===
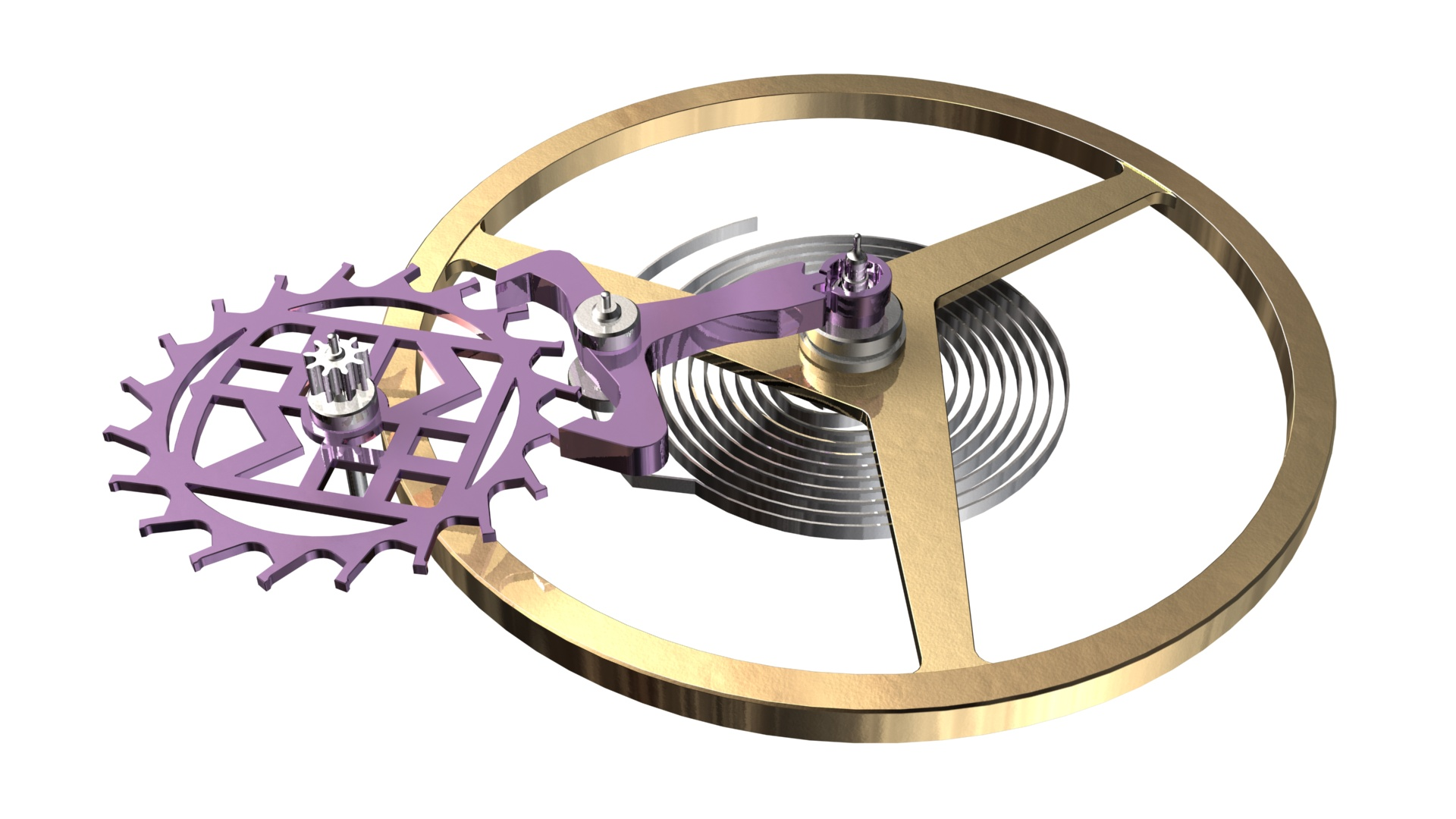
Frédérique Constant escapement wheel made of silicon

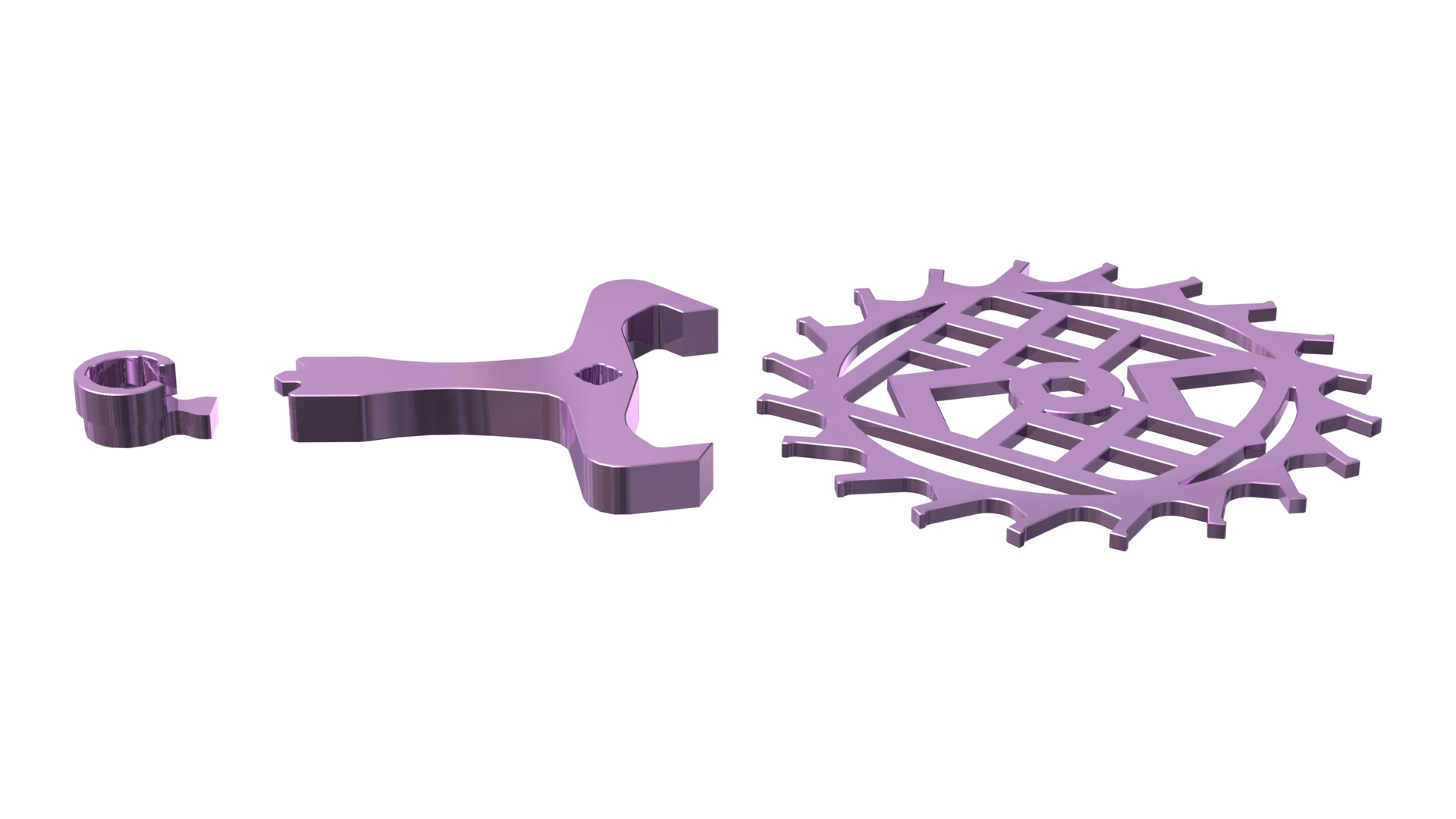
Frédérique Constant escapement made of silicon; anker, wheel and plateau

In February 2007, Frédérique Constant began production of the silicon escapement wheel, which was first introduced by Patek Philippe. Frédérique Constant created a tourbillon with a silicon escape-wheel in April 2008, and, for the first time, an amplitude of over 300 degrees between its vertical and horizontal positions. Coupled with rapid oscillation, this gives the watch an unusually high level of precision.

=== Manufacture ===
Frédérique Constant offers 33 manufacture (in-house) movements in addition to their mainstream line of Sellita-powered watches. The high-end handwinding FC-910 caliber, introduced in 2004, was joined by Tourbillon in 2008 and a mainstream FC-700 caliber range in 2009. The addition of the second-generation manufacture movements (FC-900) makes the company unusual in offering a complete in-house watch for under €2,000 MSRP. Watches with in-house movements are identified with the word, "Manufacture" in their model name, or can be identified by looking for the tourbillon, FC-9xx, FC-7xx or FC-810 movement in their specifications.

=== Worldtimer ===
Frédérique Constant introduced a Worldtimer watch in 2012 with a unique mechanism, adjusted solely via the crown. The Worldtimer function is used by selecting the desired city and placing it at the 12 o'clock position on the dial. Internal discs automatically synchronise, and after that, it is possible to see what time it is in any of the 24 cities on the dial. In addition, thin discs also indicate at a glance whether it is day (white disc) or night (black disc).

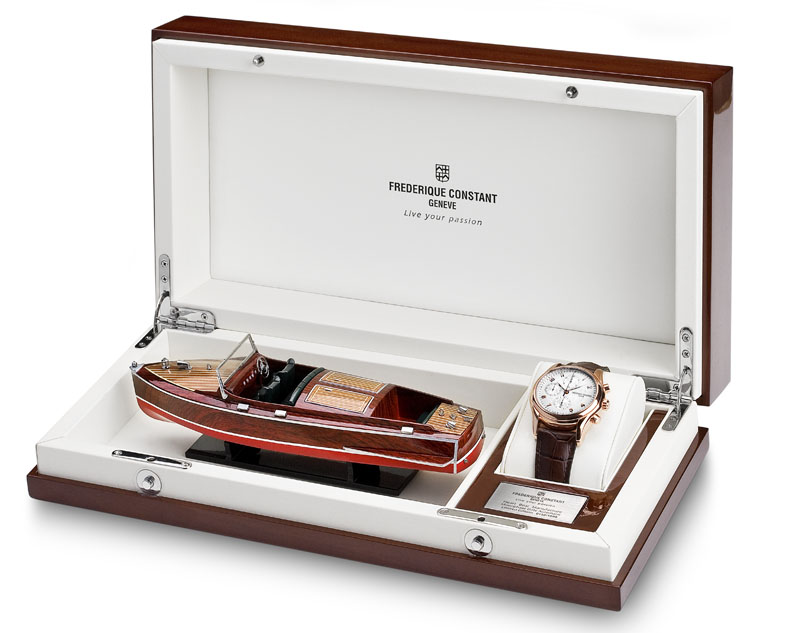
Frédérique Constant Runabout

=== Runabout product line ===
The Runabout range is a main collection of Frédérique Constant and is designed to pay tribute to the runabout gentlemen's sports boats of the Roaring Twenties. The company has sponsored the Hélice Classique Genève and Lake Tahoe Concours d'Elegance boating events, which have showcased vintage wood boats. In the same spirit, Frédérique Constant supports the conservation and preservation work of the Riva Historical Society, a Milan-based association dedicated to preserving classic Riva boats.

=== Horological Smartwatch ===
In 2015, the Frédérique Constant and Alpina brands introduced the "Horological Smartwatch", a smartwatch product with motion and sleep tracking functions that uses a secondary analog dial rather than a screen for its display – giving the timepiece a more classic look than other such devices. The lack of a display screen also provides significant power saving – enabling a battery life of two years or more, in contrast to other smartwatches that must be charged daily. This product line uses "MotionX" core technology, licensed from the California-based company Fullpower Technologies and was developed in a joint venture known as Manufacture Modules Technologies.

=== Hybrid Manufacture Smartwatch ===
In 2018, Frédérique Constant revealed the world's first mechanical smartwatch, the Hybrid Manufacture that fuses smartwatch technology with a mechanical movement.

== Collections ==
Frédérique Constant offers three distinct collections:

- Classics – Watches that follow the traditional Swiss watchmaking designs.
- Highlife – A sport-chic take on watchmaking.
- Manufacture – In-house calibres with complications and luxury finishing.

== See also ==
- List of watch manufacturers
