= NetMind =

NetMind Technologies was an Internet software company founded in February 1996 by Matt Freivald, Mark Richards and Alan Noble.

The company pioneered Internet change detection and notification (CDN) at a time when most companies were still focused on Internet search.

== About ==
=== Origins ===
NetMind started at the Tech Farm Ventures incubator in Sunnyvale and then rapidly expanded into a headquarters in Campbell and an engineering office in Santa Cruz, California, growing to 60 employees.

=== Innovation and market presence ===
NetMind was the first company to develop so-called persistent search for automatically notifying users of changed search results, a capability developed only much later in products such as Google Alerts. NetMind's popular "Mind-it" change detection and notification service amassed over 6 million users in less than 4 years. The product was also used by companies like Boeing, eBay, etc. In May 1999, NetMind was named one of Upside Magazine's Hot 100 industry startups.

=== Acquisition ===
In February 2000, NetMind was acquired by Puma Technologies later renamed Intellisync and in turn acquired by Nokia in 2005.

== Patents and legacy ==
NetMind was granted five US patents in the area of change detection:

- 6,219,818 Checksum-comparing change-detection tool indicating degree and location of change of internet documents
- 6,012,087 Unique-change detection of dynamic web pages using history tables of signatures
- 5,983,268 Spreadsheet user-interface for an internet-document change-detection tool
- 5,978,842 Distributed-client change-detection tool with change-detection augmented by multiple clients
- 5,898,836 Change-detection tool indicating degree and location of change of internet documents by comparison of CRC signatures

Change detection and notification (CDN) is assigned to TCP/IP port 2412 with IANA port numbers.
