= Fullpower Technologies =

American wearable product technology company

Fullpower Technologies, Inc.
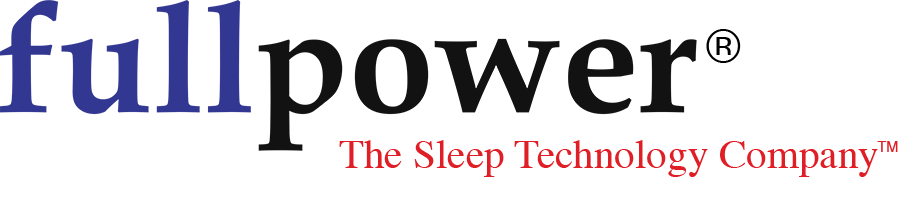
- Type: Private
- Industry: Wireless, Life Sciences, Biotech
- Founded: 2005; 21 years ago
- Founders: Philippe Kahn; Sonia Lee
- Headquarters: Santa Cruz, California, United States
- Key people: Philippe Kahn; (CEO); Sonia Lee; (President)
- Products: Sleeptracker sleep monitoring, MotionX motion sensing, Opioid management and compliance
- Website: Official website

Fullpower is an American privately held developer of cloud-based IoT and wearable product technology used for activity tracking and sleep monitoring. The company was founded in 2005 by entrepreneurs Philippe Kahn and Sonia Lee and is based in Santa Cruz, California. Fullpower specializes in wireless technology, microelectromechanical systems, and nanotechnology. The company holds over 125 patents for its intellectual property, which it licenses to manufacturers.

== History ==
=== 2005–2009 ===
Fullpower was founded in Santa Cruz, California in 2005 by entrepreneurs Philippe Kahn and Sonia Lee, who had previously founded and sold technology companies Starfish Software and LightSurf. The inspiration behind some of the key Fullpower technology came from Kahn's passion for sailing; he created prototype sleep trackers using biosensors that optimized 26-minute power naps to maximize sleep benefits and sail time.

In 2008, the company launched its MotionX Platform tracking technology, which included licensing deals to include the technology on third party devices. Later in 2008, the company launched iOS gaming apps MotionX Poker and MotionX Dice, along with handheld GPS app MotionX-GPS, targeted to outdoor enthusiasts.

In September 2009, the company released MotionX-GPS Drive for the iPhone, a door-to-door pedestrian and driving navigation application. The company later released customized versions of its navigation application for the iPad.

=== 2010–2016 ===
In September 2010, Nike released the Nike+ Running App (now called Nike+ Running) that tracks human motion using the accelerometer and GPS sensors of the iPhone and Android phones. MotionX provides the underlying motion sensing technology for the Nike+ Running Application, which was later named one of 2010's best apps of the year by the Wall Street Journal.

At the 2011 Consumer Electronics Show, JVC and Pioneer Corporation announced car stereo systems that integrate with the MotionX-GPS Drive application so that driving directions are shown on the in-car screen and audio verbal directions are heard over the car speakers. This was said to be the first time a commercially available iPhone navigation application used an after-market in-car screen as a display. In November 2011, Jawbone launched the UP band with ID design by Yves Béhar and integrated with the MotionX technology.

In February 2012, the MotionX 24/7 application was announced for the Apple App Store, with functions for sleep analysis, heart rate monitoring, and activity monitoring.

In 2015, Fullpower partnered with Swiss watch corporation Union Horlogere Holdings to form the joint venture Manufacture Modules Technologies (MMT), and launched the MotionX Horological Smartwatch Open Platform for the Swiss watch industry. The initial partners were Frederique Constant, the Geneva-based luxury watch manufacturer of classical watches; Alpina, the Swiss Sports Watch manufacturer founded in 1883; and Mondaine, known for its SBB Swiss Railway watches.

In November 2015, watchmaker Movado announced the release of the Movado Motion collection of fine Swiss made watches, using MMT's MotionX technology platform.

=== 2017-present ===
In February 2017, Fullpower partnered with bedding product company Simmons to launch the Beautyrest Sleeptracker monitor, designed to monitor two individuals' sleep patterns. In June, Tomorrow Sleep also started selling Sleeptracker monitors powered by Fullpower technology.

In August 2019, Fullpower announced a partnership with mattress manufacturer Tempur Sealy to make beds that analyze sleep and snoring patterns, and adjust to correct sleep problems.

In January 2020, Fullpower partnered with opioid risk management company OPOS to develop an application to monitor the effects of opioids on patient sleep cycles.

== Products ==
=== MotionX ===
MotionX brand logo

The MotionX Platform is a suite of coupled and integrated firmware, software and communication components for wearable wireless devices. The MotionX Platform is used by several wearable product brands, including Nike, Manufacture Modules Technologies (MMT), Alpina, Frederique Constant, Mondaine, and Jawbone.

MotionX-GPS is a handheld GPS Multi-Sport app for runners, hikers, sailors, stand-up paddleboarding (SUP), cyclists, geocachers, and other outdoor sport enthusiasts. It leverages the iPhone built-in GPS chip as well as other on-board sensors to provide location data. MotionX-GPS supports map data provided by OpenStreetMap, Google, USGS and others.

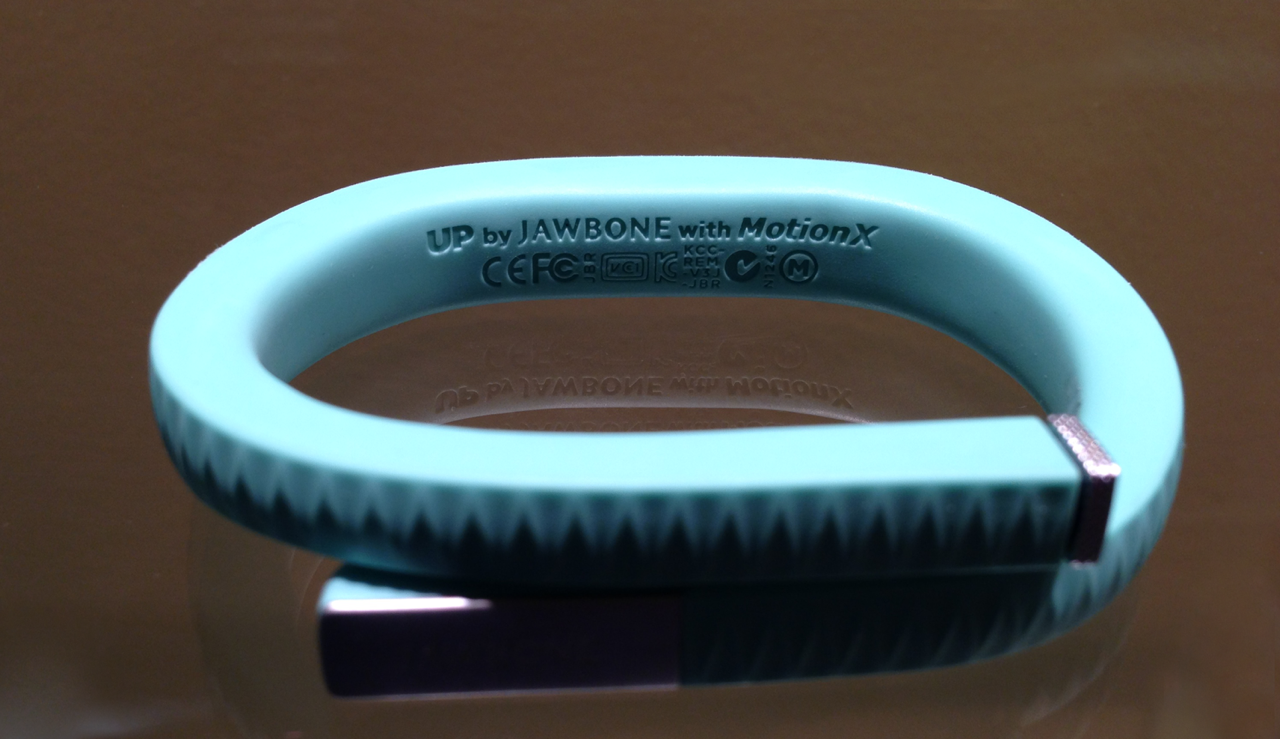
Jawbone UP Band with MotionX technology inside

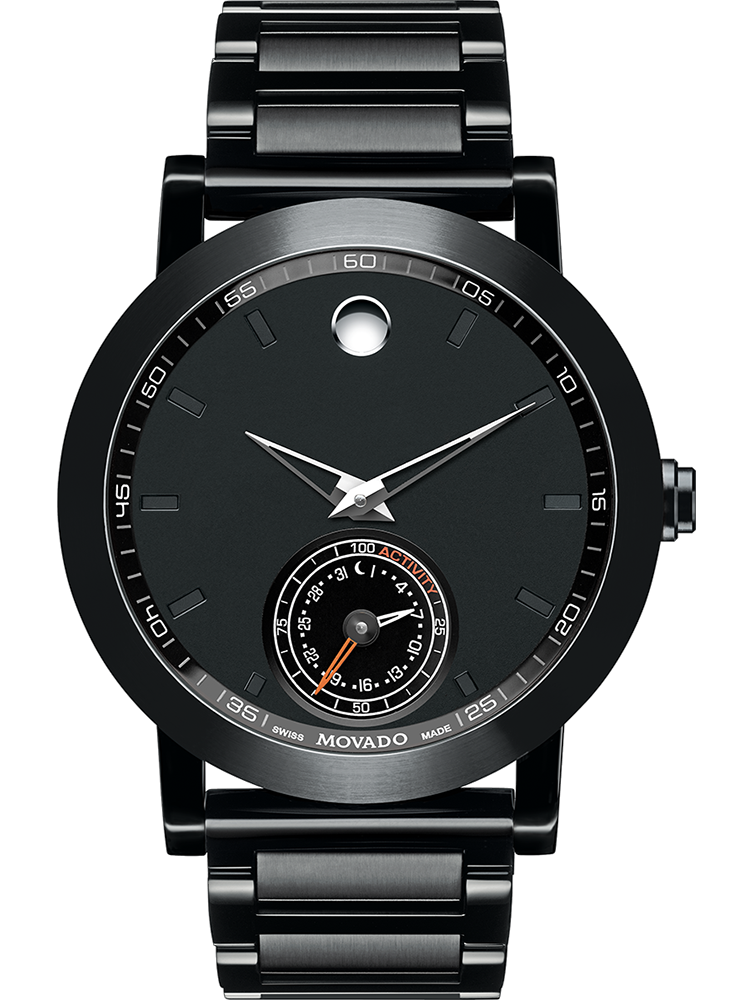
Movado Museum Sport Motion Smartwatch powered by MotionX

=== Sleeptracker ===
Sleeptracker is a cloud-based, stand-alone solution capable of monitoring two individuals simultaneously and providing personalized tips to improve sleep. The system utilizes Fullpower's Sleeptracker Artificial Intelligence (AI) Engine, which has sensors to detect snoring and silently adjusts a sleeper's head position. It can also raise the bed and elevate the upper body 15 degrees to minimize snoring, and produces a daily customized sleep report and sleep score. The technology is used by bedding product companies including Serta, Simmons, Tempur Sealy, and Tomorrow Sleep.

=== Opioid management ===
Fullpower develops an application in conjunction with opioid risk management company OPOS that combines artificial intelligence and sleep sensors to help monitor the effects of opioids on a patient's sleep cycles.

== Manufacture Modules Technologies (MMT) ==
Manufacture Modules Technologies (MMT) is a joint venture between Fullpower and Swiss watch corporation Union Horlogere Holdings. Fullpower creates and manages the circuit design, firmware, smartphone applications, as well as the cloud Infrastructure. MMT manages the Swiss watch movement development and production, as well as licensing and support for the Swiss watch industry.

== Patents ==
As of December 2016, the Fullpower wearable patent portfolio includes more than 125 patents issued or pending covering Sleeptracker, MotionX, bands, pods, smartwatches, eyewear, clothing, sensor-fusion, health, medical, wellness and machine learning.

Some of Fullpower's issued US patents include:

- US patent number 11,793,455 covers a sleep sensor system that monitors a sleeper on an adjustable smart bed and gathers data on the sleeper's movement. With this system is a receiver that connects to a server for data transmission allowing for uninterrupted analysis of the data.
- US patent number 11,766,213 a compliance and effectiveness tracking (CETE) system combining "sensed sleep data, perceived sleep data obtained from the user, and predicted sleep data derived from user background and medical intervention history". The system provides insights into the effectiveness of medical intervention and compliance with protocols through evaluation for medical providers and users.
- US patent number 9,474,876 B1 covers a sleep monitoring system, including a “method or apparatus to improve sleep efficacy” by monitoring user's sleep patterns continuously and making adjustments to various types of sleep aids accordingly.
- US patent number 9,192,326 covers a sleep monitoring system, including monitoring a user's movement to determine when the user is falling asleep, as well as distinguishing between power naps and longer sleeps. This enables the user to optimize their sleep patterns, including setting wake-up alarms, allowing them to wake at the optimal time in their sleep cycle to feel more refreshed.
- US patent number 8,996,332 covers key practical aspects of monitoring human activity, specifically identifying motion states of the user. Automatic activity identification is important for smartwatches and advanced fitness trackers.
- US patent number 8,568,310 is "a method of using a motion sensor and a location-based sensor together to perform sensor fusion, enabling activity identification," according to the patent description. Other related US Patents include numbers 7,647,195, 7,970,586, and 8,320,578.
- US patent number 8,187,182 outlines a method and apparatus using sensor fusion for accurate activity identification. US patent number 7,705,723 outlines a method and apparatus to provide outbreak notifications based on historical location data.
