= Friese-Greene =

Friese-Greene may refer to:

- Claude Friese-Greene (1898–1943), a British-born cinema technician and filmmaker, son of William
- Tim Friese-Greene (contemporary), an English musician and producer, grandson of Claude and great-grandson of William
- William Friese-Greene (1855–1921), a British portrait photographer and prolific inventor, in particular of early devices for moving pictures.

== See also ==
- Friese
- Greene (surname)
