= Aletta Stas-Bax =

Dutch entrepreneur and author (born 1965)

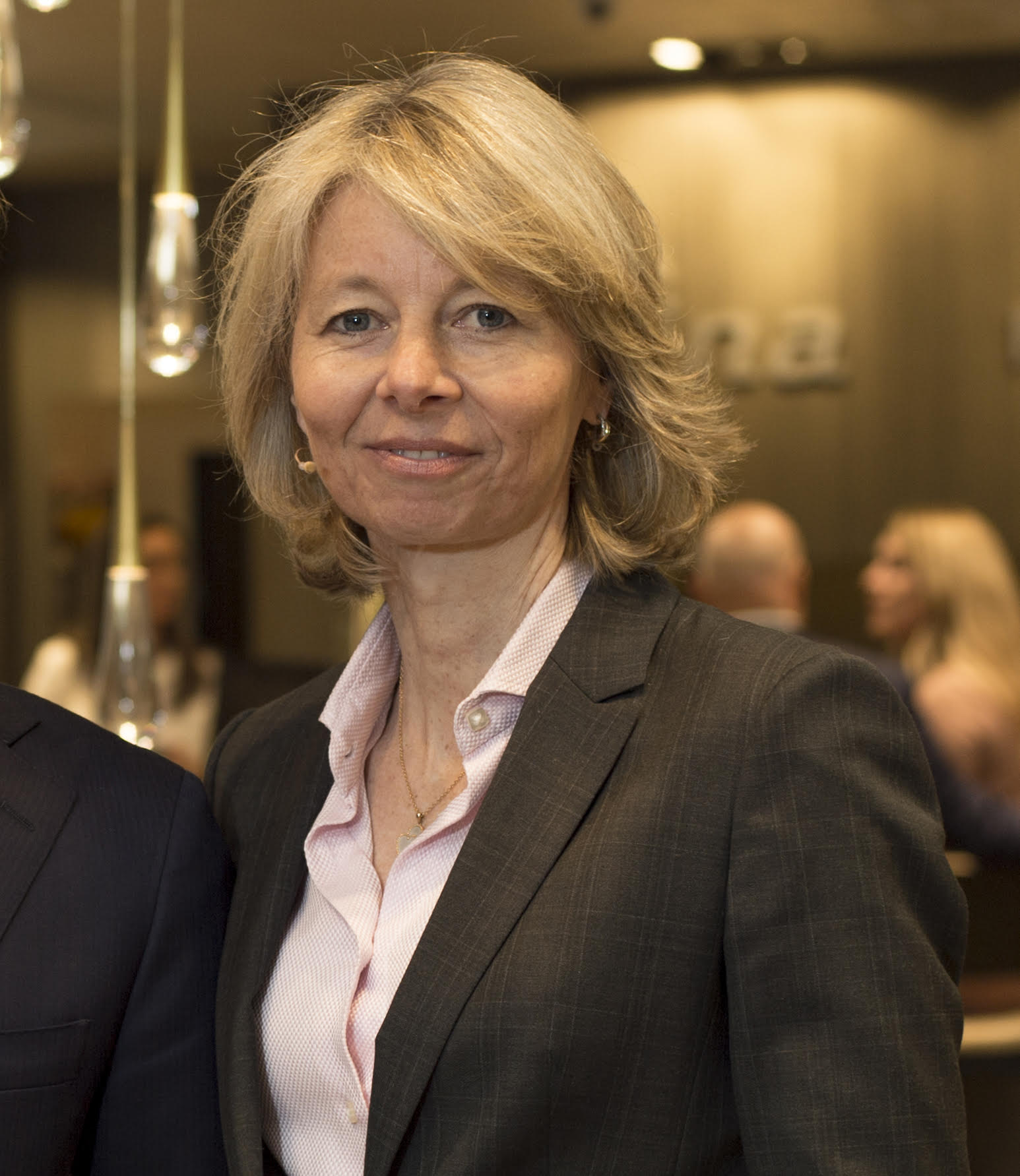
- Stas-Bax in 2017
- Born: Aletta Françoise Frédérique Bax; May 9, 1965 (age 61); Den Helder, Netherlands
- Education: Leiden University
- Occupation: Member of the executive board of Frederique Constant
- Spouse: Peter Stas
- Children: 2
- Website: Frederique Constant

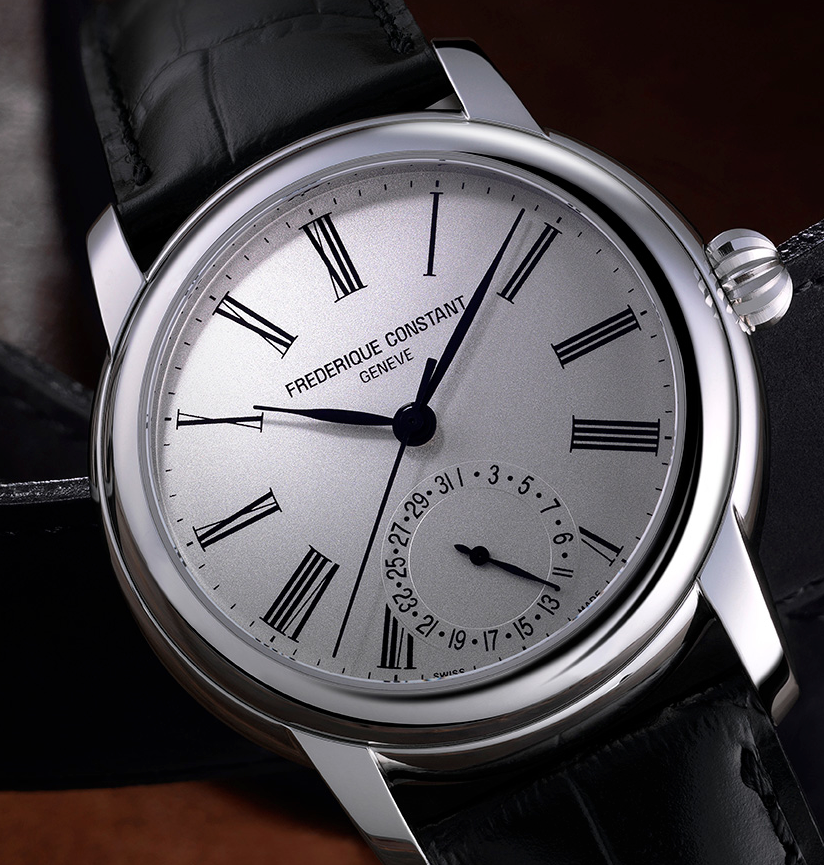
A wristwatch from Frederique Constant, the company founded by Aletta Stas-Bax and husband Peter Stas

Aletta Stas-Bax (born 1965) is a Dutch entrepreneur and author. In 1988, together with her husband Peter Stas, she founded the watch company Frédérique Constant. The company initial strategy centered on producing classical luxury watches at an affordable price. This strategy was the basis of strong growth during the 2007–2008 financial crisis when consumers were looking for lower prices.

== Career ==
Stas-Bax earned recognition as one of hundred most successful and influential female entrepreneurs in The Netherlands, as well as being named among the 20 most influential women in Switzerland.

Stas-Bax is an advocate of gender diversity in board of directors.

In 2013, in collaboration with her husband Peter Stas, Gisbert L. Brunner and Alexander Linz, Stas-Bax to write the book Live your passion, Building a watch manufacture.

Stas-Bax is a member of the board of directors of Frédérique Constant.

== Selected works ==
- Stas-Bax, Aletta; Stas, Peter; Brunner, Gisbert L.; Linz, Alexander (2013). Live your passion, Building a watch manufacture. Ebner Verlag.
