= Friese =

Friese is a surname.

Notable people with the name include:

- Christian-Peter Friese, (1948-1970), victim at the Berlin wall
- Donald Friese (born 1940), American billionaire businessman
- Friedemann Friese (born 1970), German board game designer
- Heinrich Friese (1860–1948), German entomologist
- Nancy Friese (born 1948), American visual artist, printmaker, educator
- Peter Friese (born 1952), German art historian and curator
- Richard Friese (1854–1918), German animal and landscape painter
- Werner Friese (1946–2016), East German football player

== See also ==
- Friese Buurt, a hamlet in the Dutch province of North Holland
- Friese-Greene, a disambiguation page
