= Philippe Kahn =

French entrepreneur and camera phone creator (born 1952)

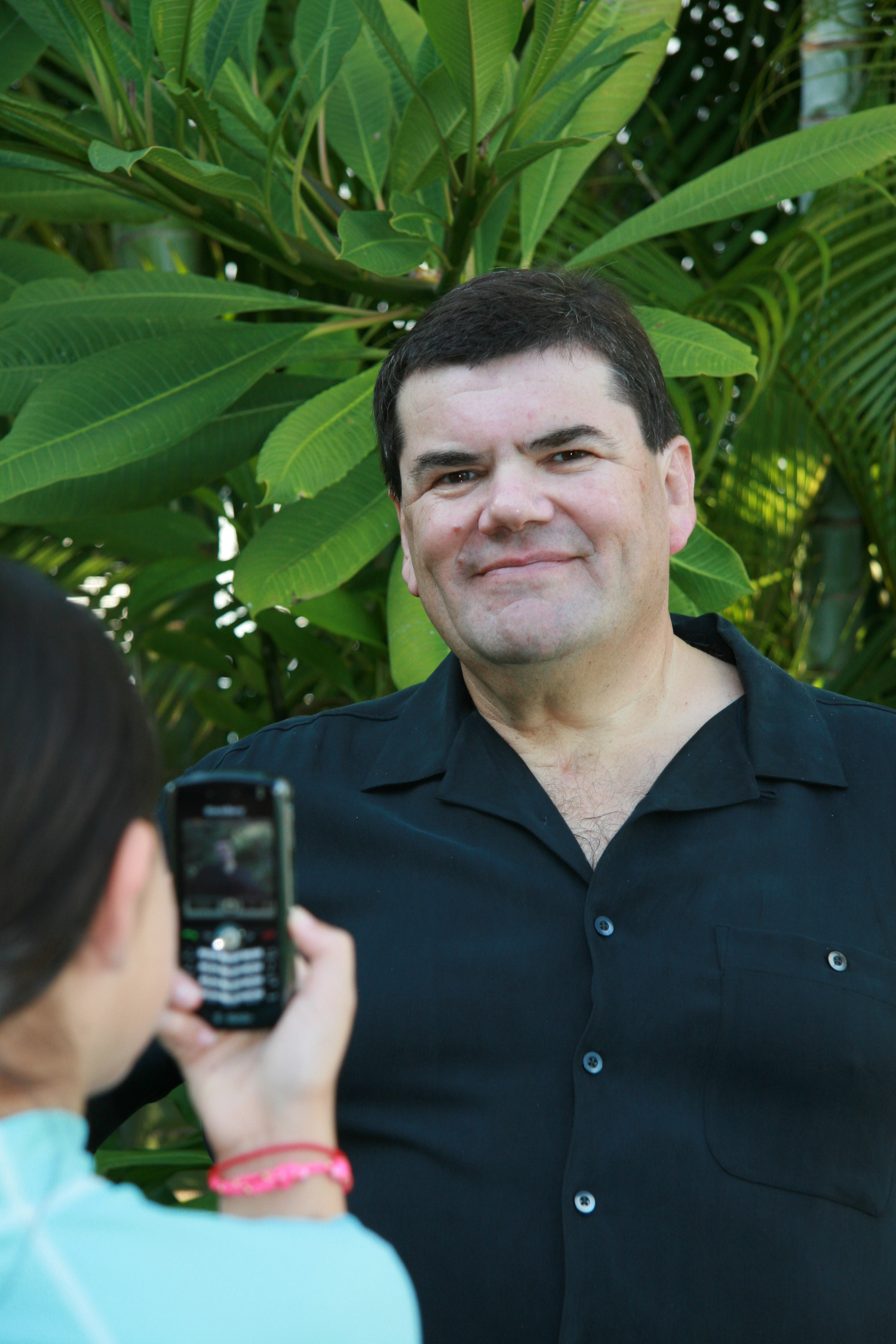
- Kahn in 2007
- Born: 16 March 1952 (age 74); Paris, France
- Occupations: CEO of Borland Software, Fullpower Technologies, Inventor, Entrepreneur
- Known for: Executive, inventor, serial entrepreneur
- Spouse: Sonia Lee

Philippe Kahn (born 16 March 1952) is a French engineer, entrepreneur, and founder of four technology companies: Borland, Starfish Software, LightSurf Technologies, and Fullpower Technologies. Kahn is credited with creating the first camera phone, being a pioneer for wearable technology intellectual property, and is the author of dozens of technology patents covering Internet of Things (IoT), artificial intelligence (AI) modeling, wearable, eyewear, smartphone, mobile, imaging, wireless, synchronization and medical technologies.

== Early life and education ==
Philippe Kahn is the son of Charles-Henri Kahn (1915–1999) and Claire Monis (1922–1967).

Kahn was born and raised in Paris, France.

His mother was a French singer, actress, and violinist, raised in Paris by parents who had fled the Russian pogroms. Arrested in 1942 for being Lieutenant in the French Resistance, she was 21 years old when she was sent to the Auschwitz extermination camp. She survived as a member of the Auschwitz Women's Orchestra conducted by Alma Rosé. After his parents separated in 1957, Philippe Kahn was raised solely by his mother. He was only 15 years old when his mother died in a car accident in Paris.

Kahn was educated in mathematics at the ETH Zurich, Switzerland (Swiss Federal Polytechnic Institute), on a full scholarship and University of Nice Sophia Antipolis, France. He received a master's in mathematics. He also received a master's in musicology composition and classical flute performance at the Zurich Music Conservatory in Switzerland. As a student, Kahn developed software for the MICRAL, which is credited by the Computer History Museum as the first ever microprocessor-based personal computer.

== Career ==
=== Technology companies ===
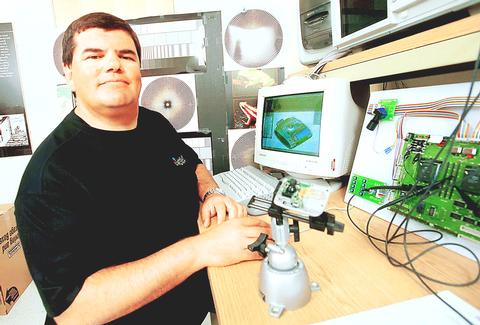
Kahn working on the first camera phones

Kahn has founded four software companies: Borland, founded in 1982 (acquired by Micro Focus in 2009), Starfish Software, founded in 1994 (acquired by Motorola in 1998, and subsequently Google in 2011), LightSurf Technologies, founded in 1998 (acquired by Verisign in 2005), and Fullpower Technologies, founded in 2005.

==== Borland ====
Kahn co-founded Borland in 1982, and was its CEO until 1995. At the time it was a competitor of Microsoft's, and produced programming language compilers and software development tools. Its first product, Turbo Pascal, sold for $49.95 at a time when programming tools cost hundreds or thousands of dollars. Kahn was president, CEO, and chairman of Borland and, without venture capital, took Borland from no revenues to a US$500 million run-rate. Kahn and the Borland board came to a disagreement on how to focus the company. In January 1995, he was forced by the board to resign from his position as CEO, and he founded Starfish Software.

Kahn encouraged a collegial and hard-charging atmosphere at Borland, which attracted and cultivated technology leaders including Anders Hejlsberg, creator of Turbo Pascal, and Marc Randolph, cofounder of Netflix.

==== Starfish Software ====
Starfish Software was founded in 1995 by Philippe Kahn as a spin-off from the Simplify business unit from Borland and Kahn's severance from Borland. TrueSync was the first Over-The-Air (OTA) synchronization system. Starfish was successfully acquired by Motorola for US$325 million in 1998.

==== LightSurf Technologies ====
Kahn and his wife Sonia co-founded multimedia messaging company LightSurf Technologies in 1998. LightSurf commercialized Picture-Mail and the camera phone.

In 2005, LightSurf was acquired by Verisign for US$300 million. Syniverse Technologies acquired Lightsurf from Verisign in 2009.

==== Fullpower Technologies ====
Fullpower, founded in 2005, provides a patented ecosystem for wearable and Internet of Things sensor-fusion solutions supporting networks of sensors. The company's expertise is sleep monitoring technology using sensors and artificial intelligence.

The inspiration behind some of Fullpower's technology stems from Kahn's passion for sailing. During a demanding race requiring sailors to sleep less than an hour every 24-hour period, Kahn began experimenting with biosensors and three-axis linear accelerometers that could detect micromovements and provide meaningful recommendations. Kahn created prototype sleep trackers using biosensors that optimized 26-minute power naps to maximize sleep benefits and sail time.

=== First camera phone ===
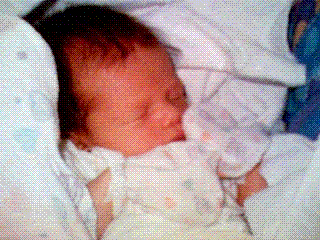
This photo taken by Philippe on 11 June 1997, of his newborn daughter Sophie was the first-ever photo taken on a camera phone.

In 1997, Kahn created the first camera phone solution sharing pictures instantly on public networks. The impetus for this invention was the birth of Kahn's daughter. He had been working for almost a year on a web server-based infrastructure for pictures, that he called Picture Mail. At the hospital, while his wife was in labor, Kahn jury-rigged a connection between a mobile phone and a digital camera and sent off photos in real time to the picture messaging infrastructure he had running in his home. Kahn later said "I had always wanted to have this all working in time to share my daughter's birth photo, but I wasn't sure I was going to make it. It's always the case that if it weren't for the last minute, nothing would ever get done."

In 2016 Time magazine included Kahn's first camera phone photo in their list of the 100 most influential photos of all time. In 2017, Subconscious Films created a short film recreating the day that Philippe instantly shared the first camera-phone photo of the birth of his daughter Sophie.

== Gay rights advocacy ==
Under Kahn's direction, Borland became the first software company to offer domestic partners full benefits and a pioneer for gay rights in Silicon Valley. Kahn was a key speaker at the pivotal gay rights conference on the Apple campus on 19 October 1993.

== Personal life ==
Kahn has four children: Laura, Estelle, Samuel and Sophie. He married Sonia Lee, with whom he has daughter Sophie. Sonia co-founded three of Kahn's companies with him: Fullpower Technologies, LightSurf and Starfish Software.

=== Sailing and sports ===
Philippe Kahn's focus on the environment and the outdoors led him to the sport of sailing. A comparatively late starter, he found success within a few years winning multiple races. He declared, "I have to learn how to sail before I die." As a result he found himself drawn to Santa Cruz, California: "I tell people, if you love sailing, you'll love Santa Cruz."

Kahn's sailing team, Pegasus Racing, has competed in numerous international world championships. An offshore sailor with over 10 trans-Pacific crossings, Kahn holds the Transpac double handed (two-crewmember) record from San Francisco to O'ahu, Hawai'i.

His sailing achievements also include winning the double handed division of the 2009 Transpacific Yacht Race from Los Angeles to Hawai'i and setting the Transpac record at 7 days, 19 hours, beating the previous time of 10 days, 4 hours.

Kahn's son Samuel ("Shark") also took up sailing as a boy. In his teenage years he had several outstanding race wins, including the 2003 Melges 24 Worlds race right after he turned 15. He has competed against his father.

== Lee-Kahn Foundation ==
Kahn and his wife Sonia run the Lee-Kahn Foundation. According to the foundation's website, it sponsors local and national non-profit organizations focused on environmental causes and works to improve access to health care, education, and the arts.
