= Intellisync =

Defunct software company in the United States

Puma Technology Intellisync Corporation
- Logo in 2004
- Founded: 27 August 1993; 33 years ago San Jose, California, U.S.
- Parent: Nokia (2006)

Intellisync Corporation was a provider of data synchronization software for mobile devices, such as mobile phones and personal digital assistants (PDAs). The company was acquired in 2006 by Nokia.

== History ==
Puma Technology (known as Pumatech) was based in San Jose, California. It was founded in August 1993 by Princeton classmates Bradley A. Rowe and Stephen A. Nicol. The company was a pioneer in the development of mobile device data synchronization software in the early day of mobile device computing, with 36 total U.S. patents awarded. Three rounds of venture capital included investors Greylock Partners CSK Venture Capital, and Intel. In April 1996, Pumatech acquired IntelliLink Corporation, based in Nahsua, New Hampshire for $3.5 million. It announced an initial public offering on the NASDAQ on 6 December 1996. It raised about $37 million and was traded under the symbol PUMA. Pumatech acquired SoftMagic in July 1998, ProxiNet in October 1999, NetMind in February 2000, Dry Creek Software in July 2000, and The Windward Group in October 2000. In March 2003, it acquired the Starfish Software division of Motorola.

Pumatech acquired the Alpharetta, Georgia based Synchrologic in late 2003 and renamed itself Intellisync Corporation (after its IntelliSync product family) in 2004. It was traded under the symbol SYNC. On 31 January 2006, stockholder approval was secured for Intellisync to be acquired by Nokia. On 10 February 2006, Nokia completed its acquisition. In November 2006 Nokia announced integration with Exchange ActiveSync and its Eseries products.

After the Nokia acquisition, the Intellisync headquarters in San Jose closed and all employees moved to the Nokia office in Mountain View, California. The company had development offices in Alpharetta, Georgia, Bulgaria, New Delhi, Tokyo and Cluj-Napoca. Nokia announced that the IntelliSync Desktop product was discontinued and the last date available to order the product was 19 July 2008. Product support was provided through 19 July 2010.

On 29 September 2008 Nokia announced it planned to cease developing or marketing its own behind-the-firewall business mobility software(Intellisync Mobility Product Suite). The appropriate technologies and expertise would reallocate to Nokia's consumer push e-mail service. Nokia said it would integrate devices with software from vendors such as Microsoft, IBM, Cisco Systems and others.

== Products ==
Pumatech's first product, released in 1997, was called TranXit. TranXit provided automatic file synchronization between two Windows-based PCs, directly competing with a then popular product called LapLink from Traveling Software, Inc. While LapLink was predominantly sold as a boxed retail product, Pumatech marketed TranXit directly to PC manufacturers who pre-installed the software on their systems. The company signed license agreements with IBM (ThinkPad), Compaq, Toshiba, Acer, Canon, NEC, Epson, and approximately 20 other PC manufacturers.

After the Intellilink acquisition, the company broadened its focus into mobile devices, introducing The Intellisync Mobile Suite software designed for individuals, corporations and wireless carriers. It included four modules, that could be installed independently or in any combination: wireless email, systems/device management, file sync and application sync. A specific application reverse proxy was sold as Intellisync Secure Gateway, for more secure firewall configuration.

The intent is to provide database synchronization with the company's application sync product; email and PIM synchronization with wireless email, and mobile device management and static file distribution with device management/file sync. These products support synchronization with a corporation's Microsoft Exchange Server, Domino mail servers or Novell GroupWise, as well as POP and IMAP mail support.

The company originally only provided software for Windows-based computers, Palm Devices, handheld PCs, and pocket PCs, but expanded into supporting Symbian, BREW, and other mobile devices. While the company originally marketed its product to large businesses (such as Boeing, Nintendo and the United States Military), it began rebranding its product to be distributed by wireless carriers as a revenue enhancing service to individual consumers. Wireless providers partnered with Intellisync included Verizon and Eurotel.

Yahoo used Intellisync products, as did Research in Motion (RIM) with its popular Blackberry family of personal communicators. AutoSync Yahoo is a product written by Intellisync to synchronize Yahoo contacts, notes, calendars and tasks with Outlook Express and MS Outlook.
