= Esther Welmoet Wijnaendts Francken-Dyserinck =

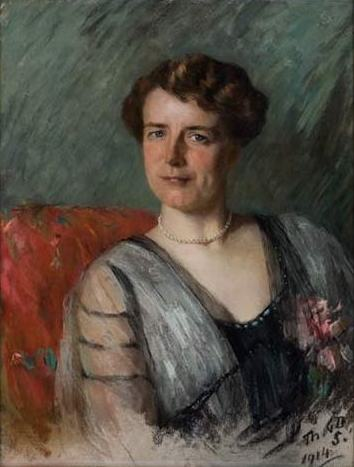
- Born: 7 February 1876; Den Helder
- Died: 11 November 1957 (aged 81); The Hague
- Other name: Welmoet Wijnaendts Francken-Dyserinck
- Occupations: Journalist and feminist
- Known for: Cofounder of Dutch Girl Guiding and the World Association of Girl Guides and Girl Scouts

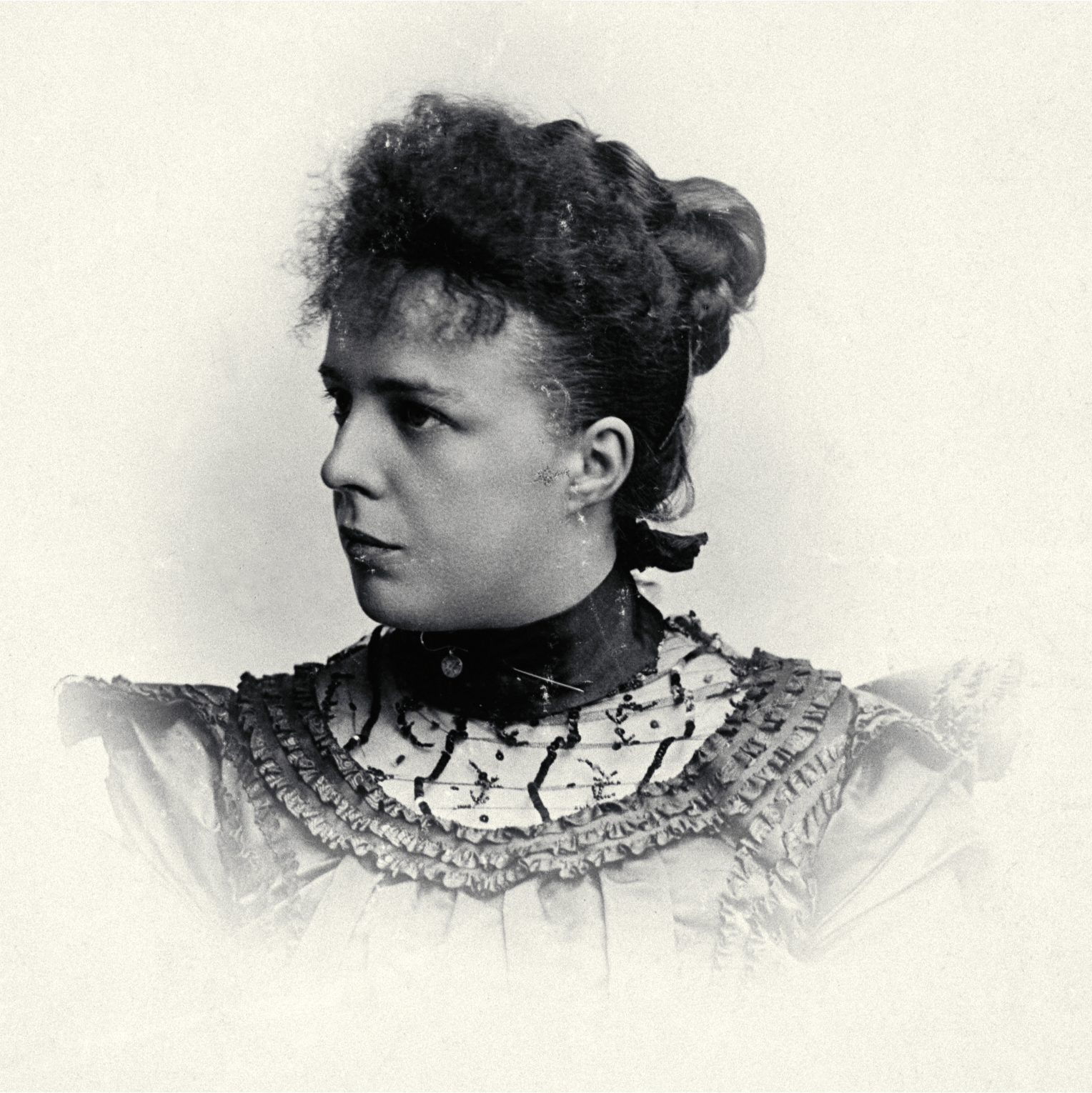

Esther Welmoet Dijserinck (Den Helder, 7 February 1876 - The Hague, 11 November 1956), known under the penname Welmoet Wijnaendts Francken-Dyserinck, was a Dutch journalist and feminist, cofounder of Dutch Girl Guiding and the World Association of Girl Guides and Girl Scouts (WAGGGS).
