= Den Helder =

- Municipality
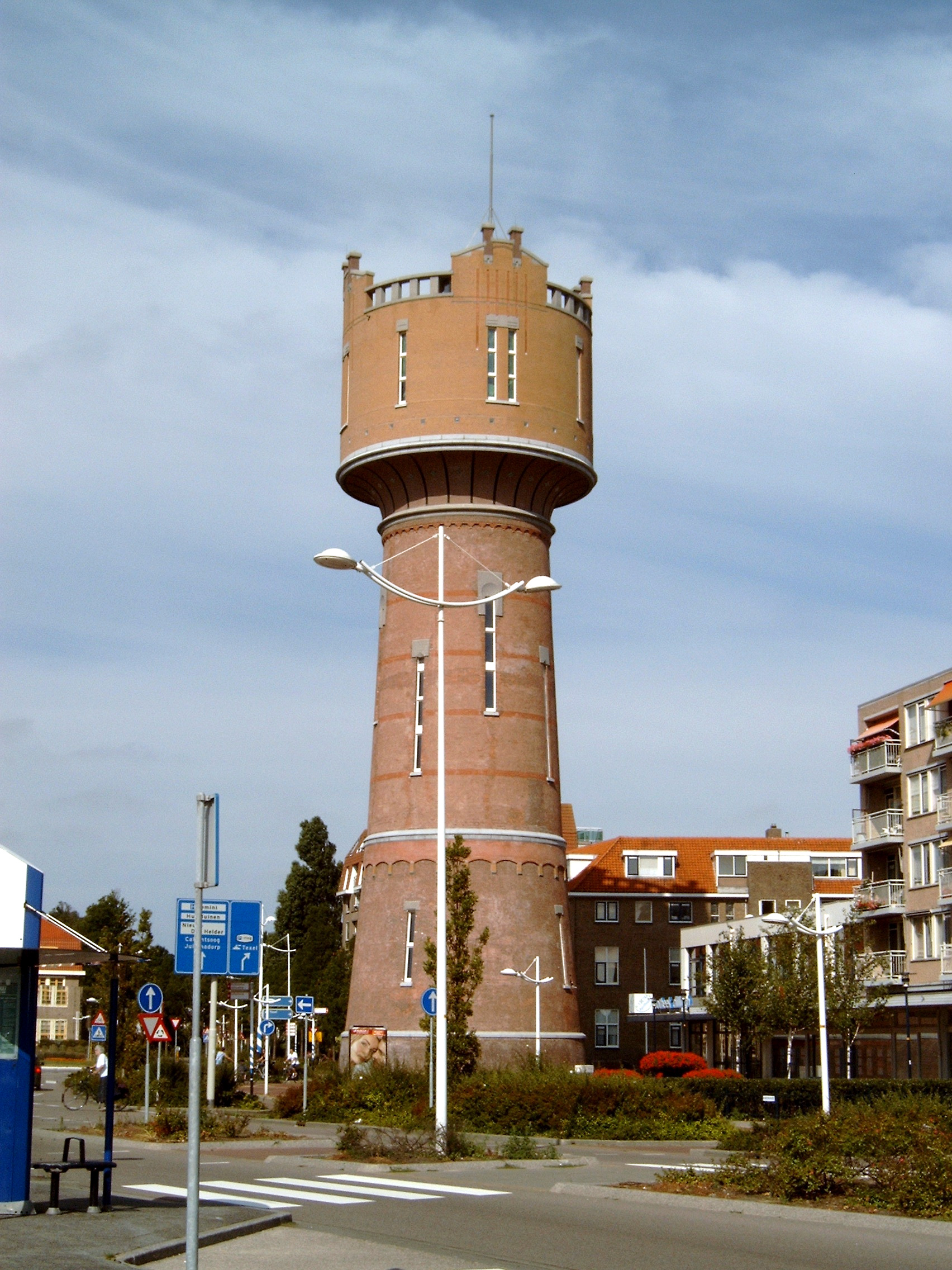
- Den Helder water tower in the village

- Flag Coat of arms

- Location in North Holland
- Coordinates: 52°56′N 4°45′E
- Country: Netherlands
- Province: North Holland

Government
  - Body: Municipal council
  - Mayor: Jan de Boer (D66)

Area
  - Total: 178.80 km^{2} (69.04 sq mi)
  - Land: 45.25 km^{2} (17.47 sq mi)
  - Water: 133.55 km^{2} (51.56 sq mi)
- Elevation: 1 m (3.3 ft)

Population (December 2021)
  - Total: 56,369
  - Density: 1,250/km^{2} (3,200/sq mi)
- Demonym: Heldernaar
- Time zone: UTC+1 (CET)
  - Summer (DST): UTC+2 (CEST)
- Postcode: 1780–1789
- Area code: 0223
- Website: www.denhelder.nl

Den Helder (Dutch pronunciation: [dɛn ˈɦɛldər]) is an industrial port town in the Netherlands, in the province of North Holland. Den Helder occupies the northernmost point of the North Holland peninsula. It is home to the country's main naval base. From here, Royal TESO operates the ferry service between Den Helder and the nearby Dutch Wadden island of Texel to the north.

== Etymology ==
Before the year 1928, the official name of Den Helder was Helder. The origin of the name Helder is not entirely clear. The name may have come from Helle/Helde, which means "hill" or "hilly grounds", or from Helre, which means a sandy ridge. Another, likely apocryphal, explanation from the 18th or 19th century is that the name derived from Helsdeur (Hell's Door), the deepest tidal inlet in the Marsdiep, named thusly because it would have been hellish for enemy ships going into the Zuiderzee to sail through.

== History ==
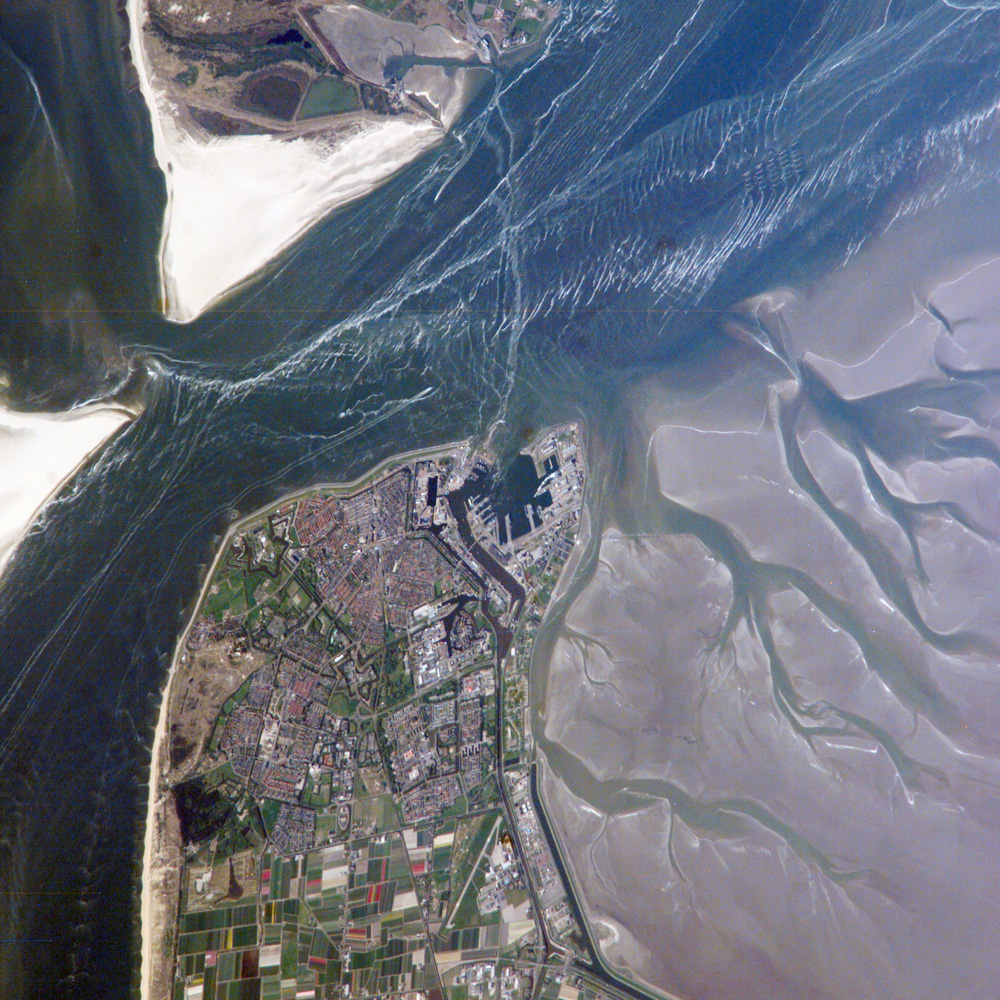
Satellite image (May 2007)

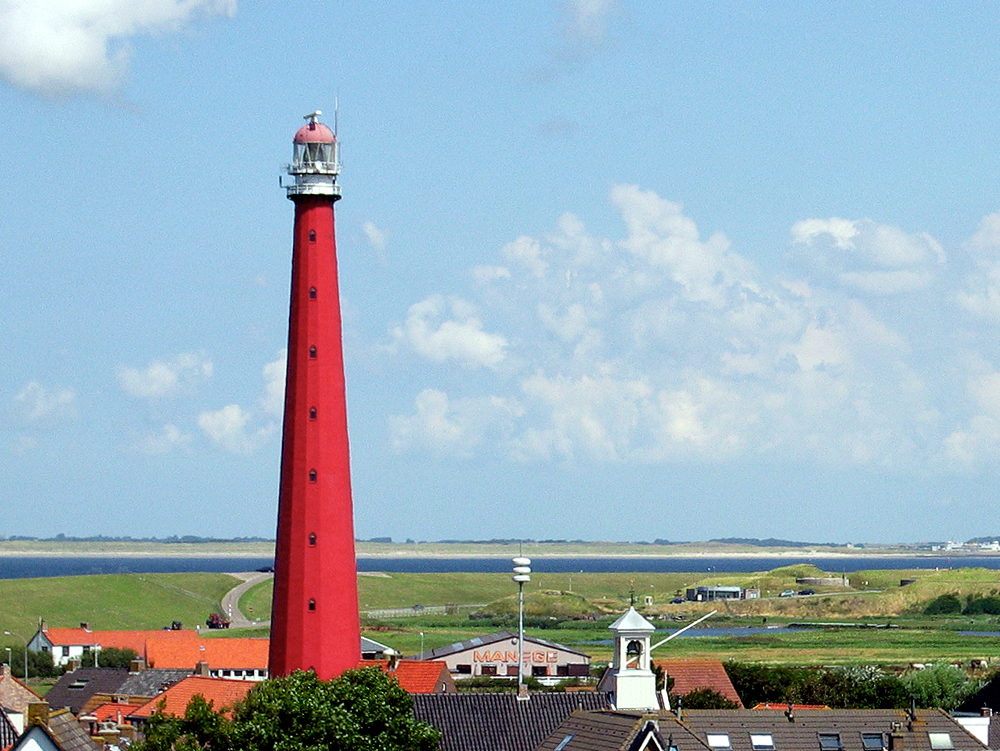
Lange Jaap lighthouse

=== Early history ===
The oldest populated place in the municipality was Huisduinen, which was first attested to as "Husidina" in the middle of the 9th century CE. After major flooding at the end of the 12th century, Huisduinen, as well as the more southern town of Callantsoog, were left behind as islands. In the Wadden Sea area east of Huisduinen, high sand dunes formed that remained dry at high tide. These dunes (nollen) were named De Schooten (now known as De Nollen), 't Torp, de Gast, Ringelsant, 't Quelderen, Henesant, and Koegras. In the late Medieval period, the area belonged to the lords of Egmond.

Helder itself was a nearby, village, founded around 1500 as die Helder buyrt on the same island. During the All Saints' Flood of 1570, large amounts of the dunes were swept away and the hamlet of Huisduinen and the village Helder disappeared. The places were subsequently rebuilt further inland. In 1610, the Zanddijk (Sand Dyke) was built, connecting Huisduinen and Callantsoog, and providing a connection with the mainland.

=== Growth ===
The new village of Helder was located at the level of what is now the Oud-Den Helder district. The population lived from fishing and pilotage.[29] The village's first church was built of wood in 1624 at a place called "de malle Croft". Due to the disappearance of coastal land, this church ended up on the beach, and in 1679 this Protestant bell-shaped church was moved to "de Conijnsbergh". Later, a Baptist meeting house, a Catholic clandestine church, an Old Catholic church and a synagogue were also built. During the Dutch Golden Age, ships would be assembled near Den Helder and sail the world's oceans from there.

To the east of the village of Helder lay a channel, the Nieuwediep, which could be transformed into a harbour by deepening and would offer much more protection than the Rede van Texel. In 1779, Stadtholder William V had the possibilities of a new harbour investigated. There was much opposition from the cities of Hoorn, Enkhuizen, and Medemblik, which saw a competing port as a serious threat to the already struggling economy of the Zuiderzee ports. Nevertheless, a decision was made in 1781 to make the Nieuwe Diep suitable for seagoing vessels, and the first works were already completed in 1782. In the years that followed, the port was further deepened until a modern tidal port was created. A mooring area for warships was built, named 'Het Nieuwe Werk'. On 23 January 1795, the French captured 14 Dutch ships and 850 guns in the town's deep-frozen harbour. In 1799, the city was the target of the Anglo-Russian invasion of Holland.

The Nieuwe Diep was originally designed as a safe port for merchant shipping. Although the population of Den Helder benefited from the new port, urban expansion did not take place because construction was officially prohibited along the Nieuwe Diep. Construction of a naval port began for the first time during the French period. After a visit by Napoleon to Den Helder in 1811, the Fortifications of Den Helder were built, which consisted of a ring of forts around the city and its harbours. Huisduinen fell outside this defence line, but was given its own fort, Fort Kijkduin. After the departure of the French in 1814, the Dutch navy was stationed in Den Helder, which developed the harbour into its main base.

In 1824, the harbour was connected to the interior by the construction of the North Holland Canal. As a result, Den Helder became an outport of Amsterdam. The consequences remained limited due to Den Helder's status as an "unfree territory," which had been assigned to Den Helder during the Napoleonic era to prevent smuggling. Goods were only allowed to be transferred from seagoing vessels onto lighters to be sailed to Amsterdam, and any other port activity was prohibited. In 1844, the government wanted to abolish the status, but Amsterdam managed to delay a decision until 1851.

The Helder Canal was completed in 1829. It connected the village with the North Holland Canal. Workers had settled along the canal during the construction of both canals, giving rise to the residential area of Nieuwstad (also called Strooien Dorp, the current Visbuurt). The residential areas of Helder and Nieuwstad expanded along the canal and became connected. New churches were built and the center shifted to the area between Willemsoord and the Oude Helder. In 1845, a steamboat service to Amsterdam was opened by Gebr. Zur Mühlen. The Royal Navy's midshipman training center established itself in Den Helder, and in 1865, at the initiative of King William III, a railway connection to Amsterdam was established.

Due to the commissioning of the North Sea Canal in 1876, the city lost a large part of its revenue. Ships destined for Amsterdam no longer passed through Den Helder. The population decreased by nearly 10%. The lighthouse Lange Jaap was built in 1877 and is the tallest cast-iron lighthouse in Europe, at 63.45 meters (208.2 ft). After the loss of the merchant navy, the fishing industry absorbed some of the losses. After a new fishing port was opened in IJmuiden, the fishermen also left the city. Because the naval institutions moved to Den Helder, workers came to the city to work at the state shipyard, nicknamed the "Wervianen".

Due to the mobilization for the First World War, hundreds of soldiers came to Den Helder, which provided a significant boost to the local economy. Between 1918 and 1921, a canal was dug, and in 1922 Queen Wilhelmina unveiled a naval monument on the Havenplein. The city reached its current size in the 1930s, becoming a prosperous city with a lively nightlife and a high level of amenities. The navy was a reliable employer during the Great Depression, which helped Den Helder become the fifth largest city in North Holland with a population of 37,328 in 1940.

=== World War II ===
The prosperity of Den Helder came to an abrupt end in May 1940, when the Netherlands was occupied by Nazi Germany. The occupiers took over the naval complexes, which prompted the Allies to bomb the city. However, the nighttime bombings often hit civilian targets. The safety of the residents could no longer be guaranteed, and consequently on June 25, 1940, a decision was made to evacuate the city. Residents had to find shelter elsewhere at night. During the day, in the initial stage of the evacuation, life in the city continued as usual. But the longer the evacuation lasted, the more often people stayed away, and large parts of the city gradually became abandoned.

Den Helder was bombed regularly, first by the Germans, later by the British and Americans. The naval bases were the main target, but many bombs fell on residential buildings. On February 19, 1943, there was a bombing raid on Willemsoord in which 39 people were killed. The city became the most bombed place in the Netherlands. From November 1943, the entire city was declared a restricted area, where only selected workers were allowed during the day.

The old center was destroyed because Germans needed a clear field of fire in case of a potential Allied invasion. The construction of the Atlantic Wall required the demolition of all buildings along the sea dike. Not only the 19th-century buildings along the Kanaalgracht and Weststraat, but also the entirety of Old Helder, the 18th-century inner city, was torn down.

=== Reconstruction and modern era ===
When the city was liberated in 1945, only a small percentage of the residents returned. Not only had some of them become victims of the war and the Holocaust, but survivors often delayed their return due to uncertainty about whether the navy and its associated employment would return to the battered city after the war.

After World War II, reconstruction commenced. In 1947, Den Helder became the main base of the Dutch navy, which contributed to the city growing to 60,000 inhabitants. From the 1970s onwards, the growth of Den Helder stagnated and after attaining a peak of 64,000 inhabitants in 1984, the population started a gradual decline. This was mainly caused by budget cuts in the Navy in the years around the end of the Cold War. In addition, catch limits in the fishing sector were introduced which further reduced economic growth in the area.

In the 2000s, plans were made to renovate the city center of Den Helder. Zeestad, an independent organization, whose shareholders are the municipality of Den Helder and the province of North Holland, was tasked with developing and implementing a program of urban renewal in Den Helder. In various places in the center, the demolition of dilapidated buildings had left gaps in the urban fabric. Through new construction in these empty areas, replacing dilapidated buildings and renovating shop facades in a historicist style, the municipality sought to create a more attractive city center.

== Geography ==
=== Climate ===
Den Helder is on the tip of a lowland peninsula jutting out into the North Sea . Because of this, Den Helder's climate is heavily moderated by the maritime environment. Also, Den Helder is one of the sunniest towns in the Netherlands.

Climate data for De Kooy, Den Helder (1991–2020 normals, extremes 1906–present)
Month	Jan	Feb	Mar	Apr	May	Jun	Jul	Aug	Sep	Oct	Nov	Dec	Year
Record high °C (°F)	13.7 (56.7)	17.2 (63.0)	20.5 (68.9)	27.9 (82.2)	31.0 (87.8)	31.7 (89.1)	34.8 (94.6)	33.8 (92.8)	32.6 (90.7)	25.1 (77.2)	17.7 (63.9)	15.3 (59.5)	34.8 (94.6)
Mean daily maximum °C (°F)	6.0 (42.8)	6.2 (43.2)	8.7 (47.7)	12.4 (54.3)	15.8 (60.4)	18.5 (65.3)	20.8 (69.4)	21.1 (70.0)	18.3 (64.9)	14.3 (57.7)	10.0 (50.0)	7.0 (44.6)	13.3 (55.9)
Daily mean °C (°F)	4.0 (39.2)	3.9 (39.0)	5.9 (42.6)	9.0 (48.2)	12.4 (54.3)	15.2 (59.4)	17.5 (63.5)	17.8 (64.0)	15.4 (59.7)	11.6 (52.9)	7.8 (46.0)	5.0 (41.0)	10.5 (50.9)
Mean daily minimum °C (°F)	1.7 (35.1)	1.4 (34.5)	3.0 (37.4)	5.5 (41.9)	9.0 (48.2)	11.8 (53.2)	14.1 (57.4)	14.4 (57.9)	12.1 (53.8)	8.7 (47.7)	5.2 (41.4)	2.6 (36.7)	7.5 (45.5)
Record low °C (°F)	−18.8 (−1.8)	−20.0 (−4.0)	−16.0 (3.2)	−5.1 (22.8)	−4.0 (24.8)	−0.3 (31.5)	4.2 (39.6)	3.9 (39.0)	0.9 (33.6)	−6.0 (21.2)	−11.9 (10.6)	−13.4 (7.9)	−20.0 (−4.0)
Average precipitation mm (inches)	65.6 (2.58)	50.1 (1.97)	43.7 (1.72)	34.9 (1.37)	42.0 (1.65)	58.7 (2.31)	62.5 (2.46)	89.1 (3.51)	84.7 (3.33)	96.5 (3.80)	83.5 (3.29)	75.3 (2.96)	786.6 (30.97)
Average precipitation days (≥ 1.0 mm)	12.1	10.6	9.0	7.7	8.2	8.6	9.4	10.9	11.8	13.0	14.3	13.5	129.1
Average relative humidity (%)	87.8	86.3	83.9	80.5	79.0	79.1	79.4	79.1	81.2	83.3	86.6	87.5	82.8
Mean monthly sunshine hours	70.2	97.8	155.7	214.5	246.6	230.4	240.5	219.7	161.2	122.1	68.5	60.6	1,887.8
Percentage possible sunshine	27.6	35.0	42.2	51.3	50.4	45.7	47.4	48.0	42.2	36.9	26.0	25.5	39.8
Source: Royal Netherlands Meteorological Institute

=== Population centres ===
The municipality of Den Helder consists of the towns and villages of Den Helder, Huisduinen and Julianadorp, and the hamlets Friese Buurt and De Kooy.

The major areas of Den Helder are the Stad Binnen de Linie (a city within the city's defence line), Nieuw-Den Helder, and De Schooten. Nieuw-Den Helder was built in the 1950s, following World War II, when there was a great need for additional housing. De Schooten was constructed in the 1960s.

=== Topography ===
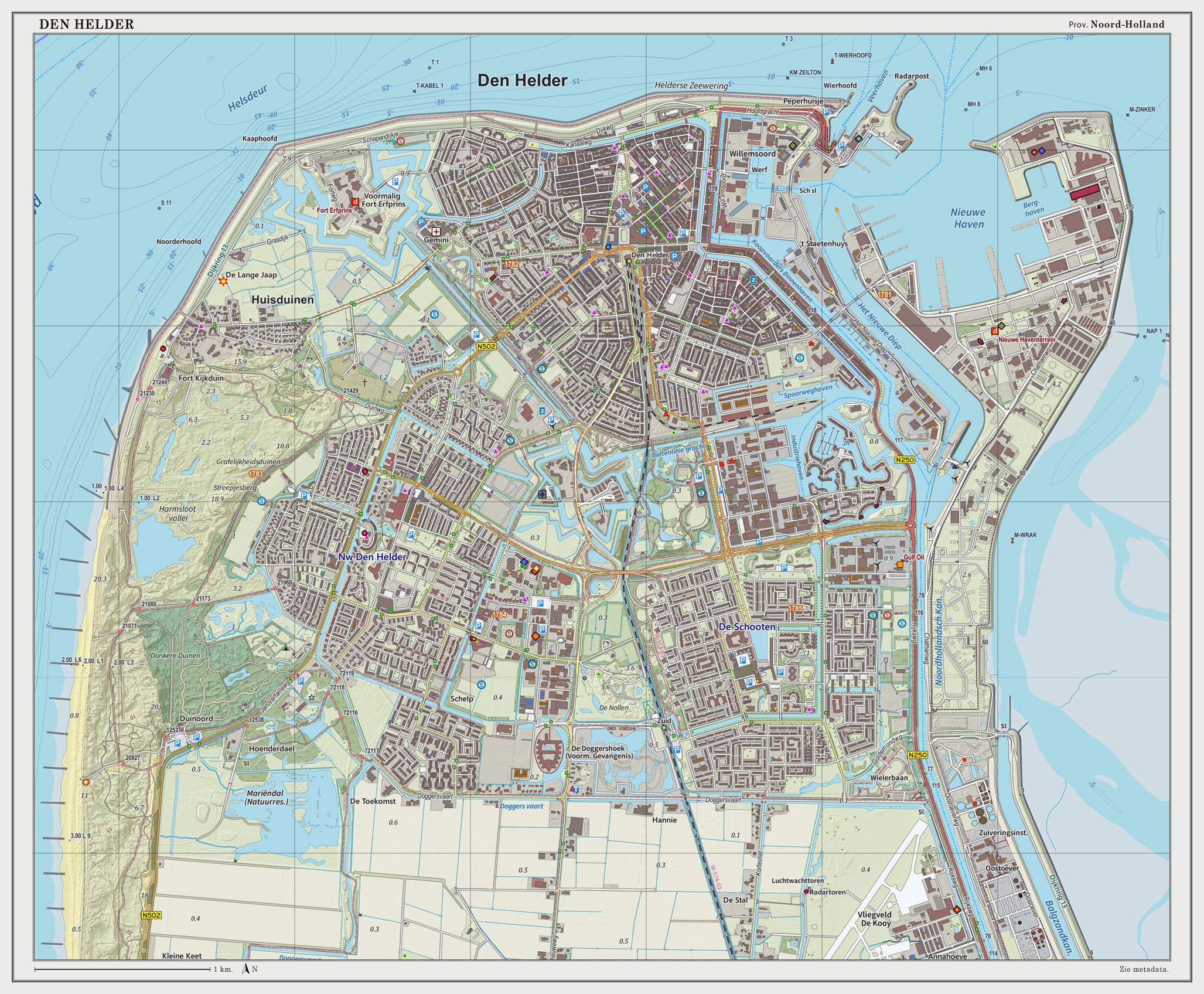

Map of Den Helder (town), March 2014.

== Naval base and fortifications ==
Den Helder was the site of a naval base as early as the 18th century. An Anglo-Russian invasion force landed at Den Helder in August 1799 and captured the Batavian navy there (see Battle of Castricum). French emperor Napoleon Bonaparte, visiting Den Helder in 1811, was impressed with the town's strategic location and ordered the construction of a fort (Kijkduin) and naval dockyards (Willemsoord). The docks were built during the years 1813–1827. In 1947, it officially became the Royal Netherlands Navy's main centre of operations. Den Helder continues to be the navy's main base today. The Royal Netherlands Naval College is also located in the city, as is the Dutch Navy Museum.

The old naval dockyards of Willemsoord, located in the north of the city, now house museums, restaurants, a cinema, and other recreational facilities. The naval docks and administration have been moved to a new location further east.

The Fortifications of Den Helder, which protected the naval base and the entrance to the Noordhollandsch Kanaal significantly altered the landscape around Den Helder. A number of the old fortresses have now been repurposed for tourism and related industries and can be visited.

== Transport ==
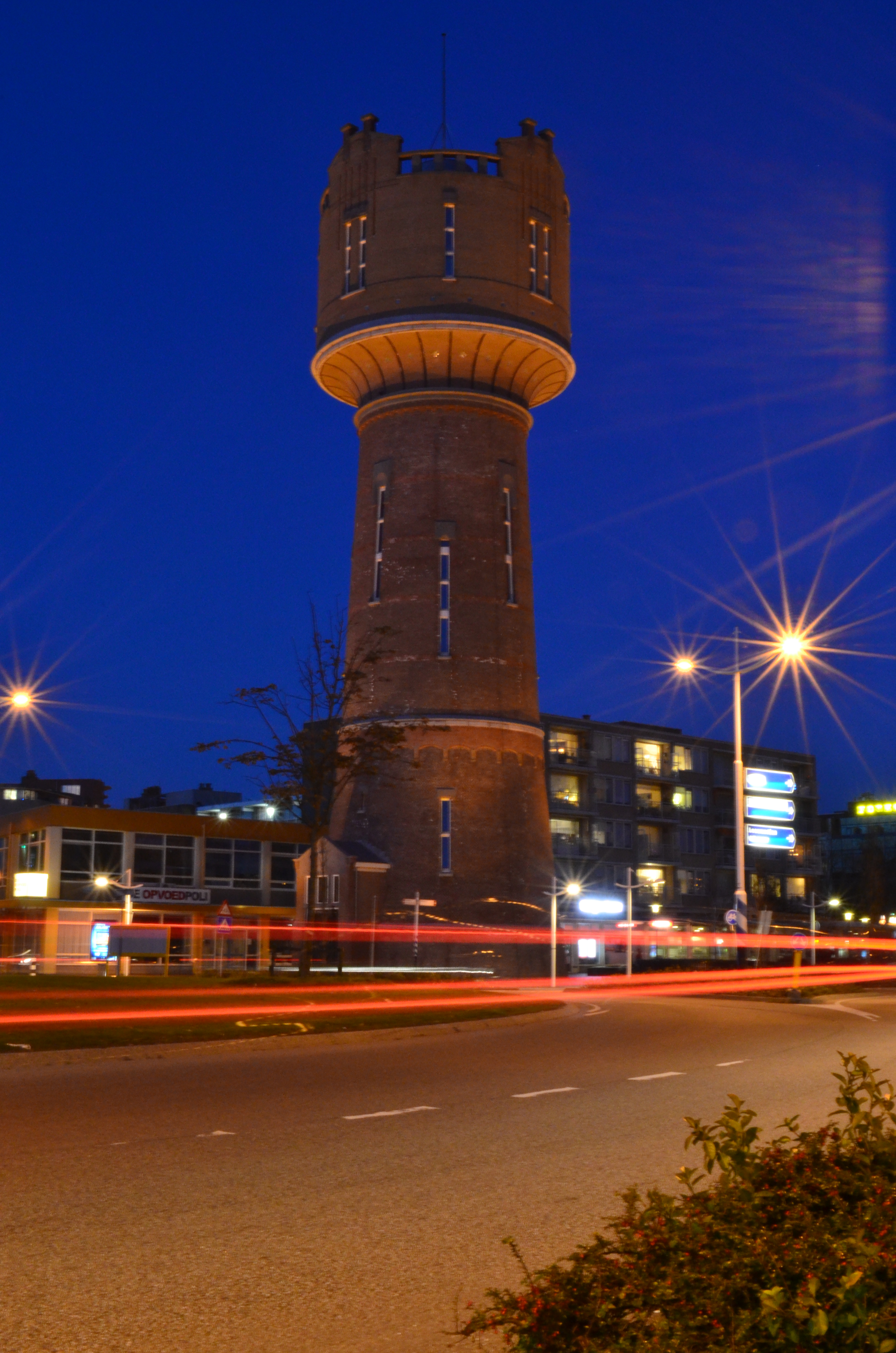
The watertower of Den Helder

The town is served by two railway stations:

- Den Helder
- Den Helder Zuid (South Den Helder)

Den Helder can be reached by these main roads:

- N9
- N99
- N250
- N502

These roads all have only two lanes. There is no highway leading to Den Helder.

Amsterdam's Schiphol Airport is located 86 km (53 mi) south of Den Helder. NS operates train services between Den Helder and Schiphol.

== Local government ==
The municipal council of Den Helder consists of 31 seats, which divided as follows in the 2026 elections:

- Behoorlijk Bestuur – 5 seats
- CDA – 4 seats
- VVD – 4 seats
- Forum voor Democratie – 3 seats
- Stadspartij Den Helder – 2 seats
- Beter voor Den Helder – 2 seats
- D66 – 2 seats
- Fractie Pastoor – 1 seat
- GroenLinks – 1 seat
- PvdA – 1 seat
- ChristenUnie – 1 seat
- PVV – 1 seat
- 50Plus – 1 seat
- Samen Actief Den Helde – 1 seat
- Socialistische Partij – 1 seat
- Senioren Partij Den Helder – 1 seat

== Notable people ==
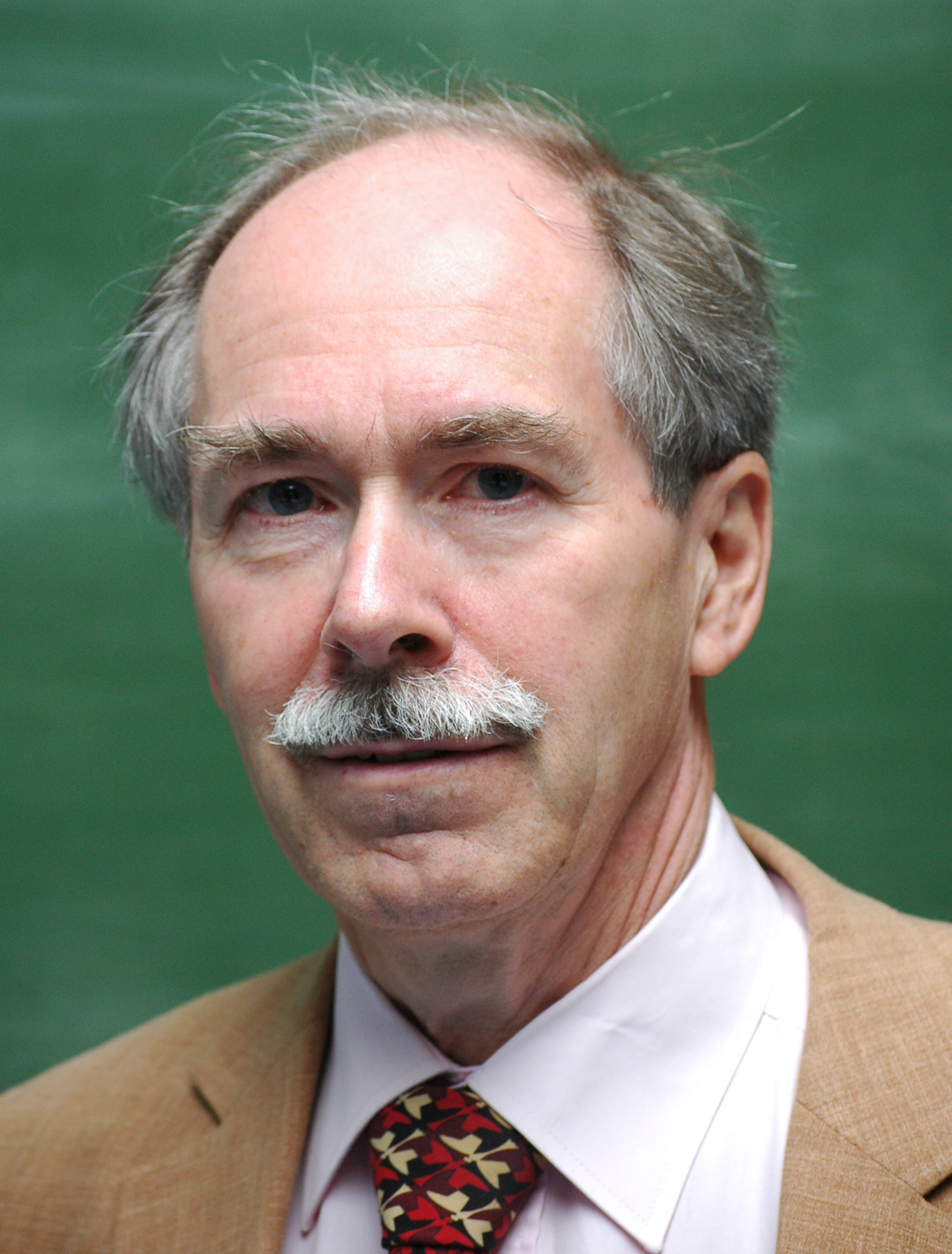
Gerard 't Hooft, 2008

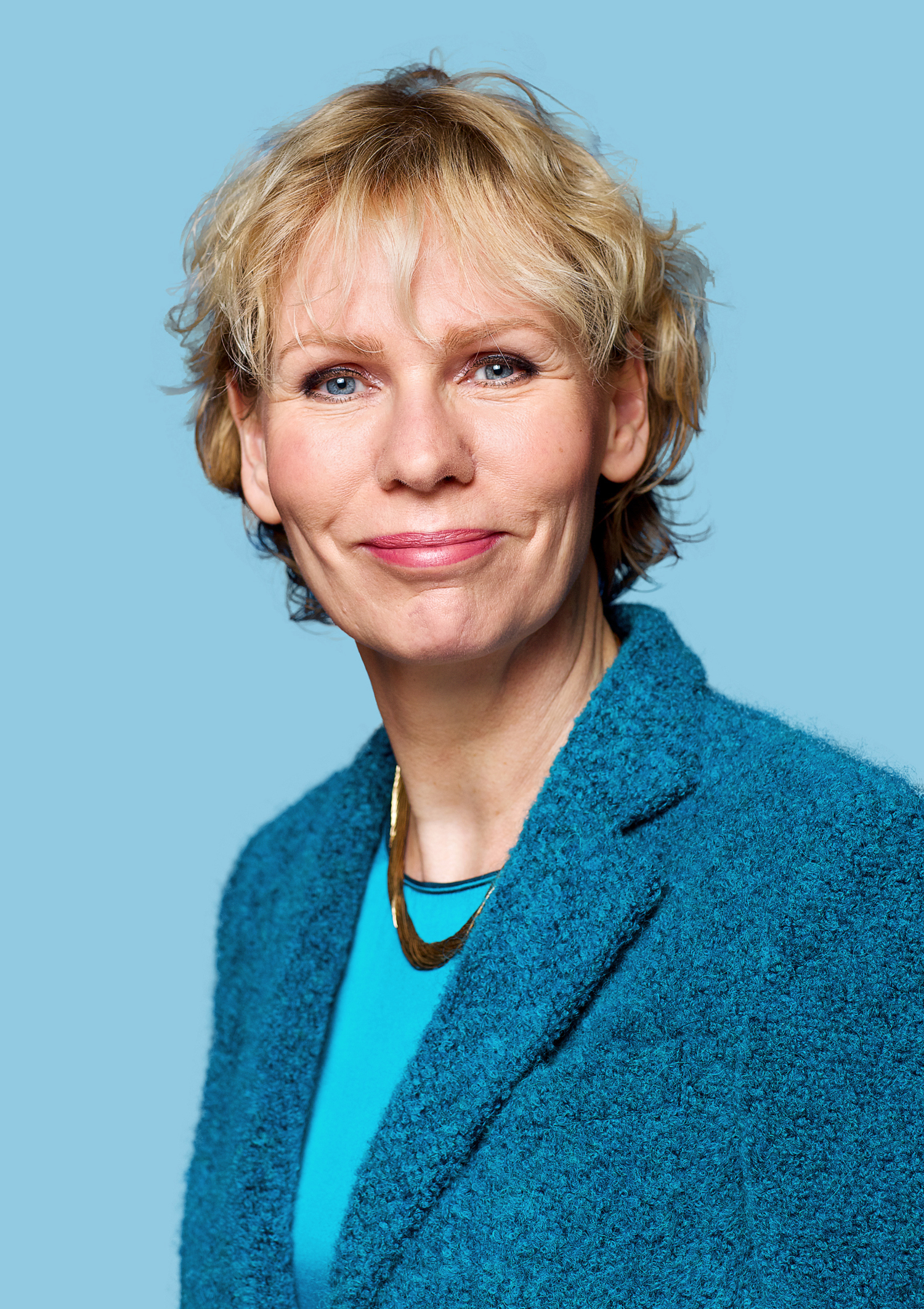
Marleen Barth, 2015

=== Public figures and politicians ===
- Frans van Anraat (born 1942), businessman, sold raw materials to produce chemical weapons to Saddam Hussein
- Marleen Barth (born 1964), politician, trade union leader and journalist
- Petrus Johannes Blok (1855–1929) a historian
- Edward W. Bok (1863–1930), Dutch-American editor, Pulitzer Prize winner
- Esther Welmoet Wijnaendts Francken-Dyserinck (1876–1956) was a journalist, feminist and co-founder of Dutch Girl Guiding
- Cornelis Giles (1675–1722), a navigator and cartographer
- Rijkman Groenink (born 1949), banker, CEO of ABN-Amro
- Gerard 't Hooft (born 1946), physicist and academic, shared the 1999 Nobel Prize in Physics
- William Lonsdale (1799–1864), soldier, colonialist, helped found Melbourne, Australia
- Theo de Meester (1851–1919) politician, Prime Minister of the Netherlands 1905 to 1908
- Ed Nijpels (born 1950), former minister of Housing (1986–1989) and former mayor of Breda
- Dorus Rijkers (1847–1928), lifeboat captain and folk hero
- Paul Rosenmöller (born 1956), a TV presenter and former politician and trade unionist
- René Schoof (born 1955), mathematician and academic in Rome
- Aletta Stas-Bax (born 1965) is an entrepreneur in Swiss watches and an author

=== The arts ===
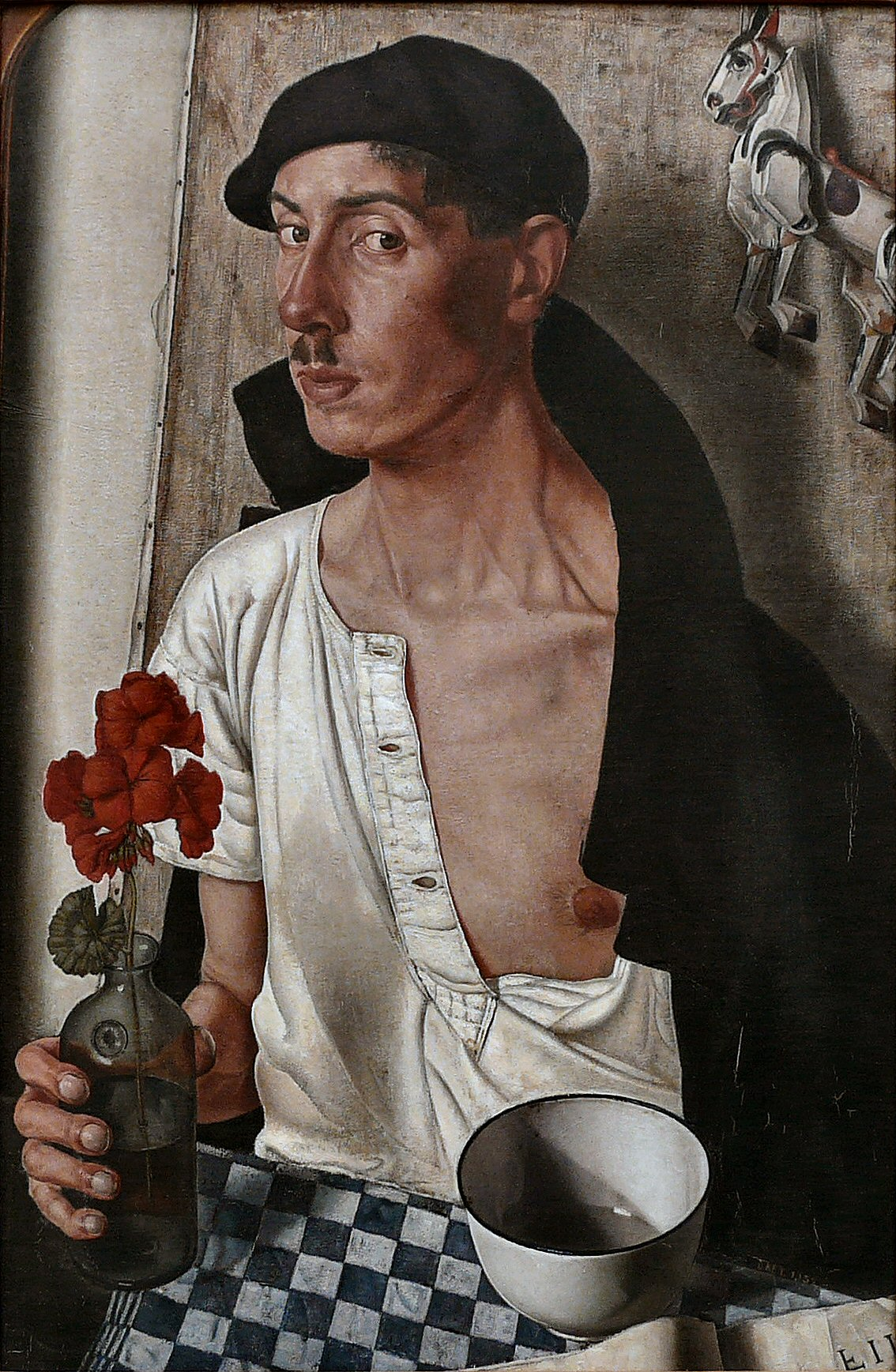
Dick Ket, Autoportrait, 1932

- IJf Blokker (1930–2026) was a musician, TV actor, and presenter
- Gré Brouwenstijn (1915–1999), opera singer
- Benjamin Feliksdal (born 1940) is a ballet dancer
- Dick Ket (1902–1940) was a magic realist painter of still lifes and self-portraits
- Hanco Kolk (born 1957) is a cartoonist and comics artist
- Anton Pieck (1895–1987), painter and graphic artist
- Milly Scott (born 1933) is a Dutch singer and actress of Surinamese origin
- Quintino (born 1985) is a DJ

=== Sport ===
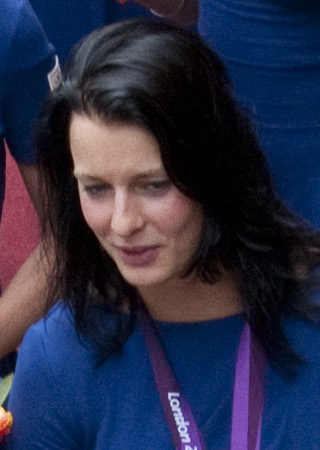
Edith Bosch, 2012

- Jorina Baars (born 1988) is a female kickboxing Thai fighter
- Edith Bosch (born 1980), Judo world champion and Olympic silver and bronze medalist
- Anthonij Guépin (1897–1964) was a sailor and bronze medallist at the 1924 Summer Olympics
- Erwin Koen (born 1978) is a former footballer with over 300 club caps
- Elien Meijer (born 1970) is a retired rower, team silver medallist at the 2000 Summer Olympics
- Swen Nater (born 1950), basketball player
- Martine Ohr (born 1964), field hockey striker, gold medallist at the 1984 Summer Olympics
- Chima Onyeike (born 1975), afootball coach and former professional player, fitness coach for VfB Stuttgart
- Hans Smits (born 1956), water polo player, bronze medallist at the 1976 Summer Olympics
- Mark de Vries (born 1975), footballer with 370 club caps, plays for ONS Boso Sneek.
- Sieme Zijm (born 1978) is a former footballer with over 300 club caps
- Jermaine Wattimena (born 1988) is a professional darts player

== In popular culture ==
The Frank Boeijen Groep song Haast (rust roest) contains the line "s avonds in Den Helder". (English: In the evening in Den Helder) The Rob de Nijs song Jan Klaassen de Trompetter contains the line "hij marcheerde van Den Helder tot Den Briel". (English: He marched from Den Helder to Den Briel).
