= Google Alerts =

Service by Google

- Website type: Change detection and notification
- Owner: Google
- Website: www.google.com/alerts
- Registration: Optional
- Launched: August 6, 2003; 23 years ago
- Current status: Active

Old Google Alerts logo

Google Alerts is a content change detection and notification service offered by Google. The service sends emails to the user when it finds new results—such as web pages, newspaper articles, blogs, or scientific research—that match the user's search term(s). In 2003, Google launched Google Alerts, which were the result of Naga Kataru's efforts. His name is on the three patents for Google Alerts.

Google reported the system was not functioning properly as of 2013: "we're having some issues with Alerts not being as comprehensive as we'd like". However, the service is still operational and completely accessible around the world.

== See also ==
- List of Google products
- Media monitoring service
