= Ateliers deMonaco =

Swiss watch manufacturer

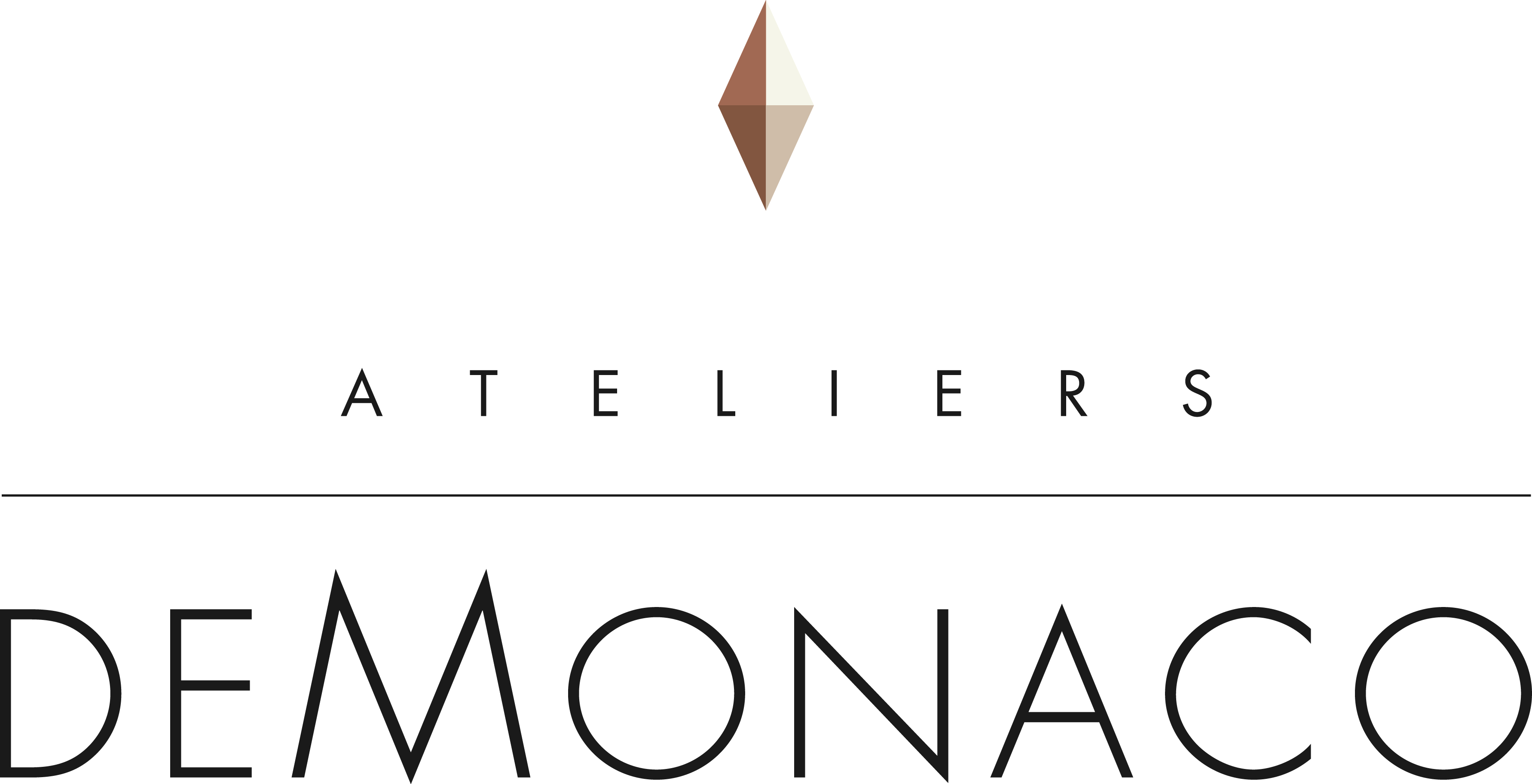
- Company type: Watch Manufacturer; Members of the Citizen Group
- Industry: Watchmaking
- Founded: 2008
- Headquarters: Geneva
- Area served: Worldwide
- Key people: Pim Koeslag, Robert van Pappelendam, Peter Stas
- Products: Watches
- Website: ateliers-demonaco.com

Ateliers deMonaco is a manufacturer of wristwatches based in Geneva, Switzerland.

== History ==
The brand was founded in 2008 by co-founders Pim Koeslag, Robert van Pappelendam and Peter Stas in the municipality of Plan-les-Ouates in western Switzerland. The company was established as a manufacture d'horlogerie, whereby most of the components of its watches are produced in-house.

In May 2016, Citizen announced its intention to acquire Ateliers deMonaco.

== Products ==
- Tourbillon Répétition Minute with patented Balance Cage. A Silicium Escapement and Lever with low weight, hardness and high corrosion resistance.
- Tourbillon eXtrem Precision 1 Minute
- Quantième Perpétuel with EaZy Adjust system, a perpetual calendar allowing to set the time, date, day, week, month and (leap) year by using the crown.
- Admiral Chronographe Flyback with direct return to zero mechanism
- Poinçon de Genève with Freebeat regulation system
- Ronde de Monte-Carlo
- Bespoke La Sirène, a reference to Charlène de Monaco and her favourite flowers the King Protea from South Africa.
