= Sonia Lee =

Korean-born entrepreneur (born 1960)

- Born: April 12, 1960 (age 65)
- Known for: co-founder and president of Fullpower Technologies co-founder of LightSurf co-founder of Starfish Software.
- Spouse: Philippe Kahn
- Children: 1

Sonia Lee (born April 12, 1960) is a Korean-born entrepreneur best known as the co-founder and president of Fullpower Technologies. Sonia Lee also co-founded LightSurf and Starfish Software.

== Biography ==
She is married to Philippe Kahn, CEO of Fullpower Technologies and ran the business side of many of his businesses. They have one child. Together, they run an environmental charity, the Lee-Kahn Foundation. She is known for her passion for landscape and still life paintings.

The picture of her new born child was the first ever camera phone picture.
