= Starfish Software =

- Type: 1998–2003: Subsidiary of Motorola; 2003–2006: Subsidiary of Pumatech, Inc. (Intellisync); 2006–2008: Subsidiary of Nokia
- Industry: Wireless software
- Founded: 1994; 32 years ago
- Headquarters: Scotts Valley, California, U.S.
- Key people: Philippe Kahn, Founder; Sonia Lee, Co-Founder; Gregg Armstrong, CEO
- Products: TrueSync

Starfish Software was an American software company founded in 1994 in Scotts Valley, California, by Philippe Kahn and Sonia Lee, best known for developing early device-synchronisation technologies, including the first over-the-air synchronisation system, TrueSync, before being acquired by Motorola in 1998 and later by Pumatech in 2003.

== History ==
Starfish Software was founded in 1994 by Philippe Kahn and Sonia Lee, as a spin-off from the Simplify business unit from Borland and Kahn's severance from Borland. It was located in Scotts Valley, California.

Starfish developed intellectual property for device synchronization, especially for wireless devices. TrueSync was the first over-the-air synchronization system. Starfish was acquired by Motorola for $325 million in 1998. The outspoken founding couple founded another company, LightSurf, in the same year, to develop mobile phone photograph technology.

In 2000, the company helped start the SyncML Initiative to standardize synchronization communication protocols. In March 2003, Starfish was acquired by Pumatech in San Jose, California, which was headed by turn-around CEO Woodson Hobbs. Pumatech later changed its name to Intellisync, and was acquired by Nokia in 2005.
