= LightSurf =

LightSurf Technologies, Inc.
- Type: 1998-2005: Private 2005-2009: Subsidiary of VeriSign 2009-present: Subsidiary of Syniverse Technologies
- Industry: Wireless
- Founded: 1998; 28 years ago
- Headquarters: Santa Cruz, California
- Key people: Philippe Kahn, Founder; Sonia Lee, Co-Founder

LightSurf was a provider of multimedia messaging and interoperability solutions for the wireless industry. The company was founded in 1998 by tech entrepreneurs Philippe Kahn and Sonia Lee and was based in Santa Cruz, California.

== History ==
LightSurf was founded in 1998 by Philippe Kahn and his wife, Sonia Lee.

The company was acquired by VeriSign in 2005 and was then sold to telecommunications service provider Syniverse Technologies in late 2009.

== Products ==
The company's core technology, the LightSurf 6 Open Standards MMS Platform, was a suite of hosted and managed MMS services that allowed users to capture, view, annotate, and share multimedia messages with any handset or e-mail address, regardless of device, file type, or network operator.

LightSurf's products include the first mobile picture messaging solution in North America, GSM, the first mobile picture messaging solution on a GPRS carrier network, the first commercially deployed inter-carrier MMS solution in North America, the highest volume of picture and video messaging in North America and over 400 million media messages shared on Sprint's network (powered by LightSurf).

== See also ==
- Philippe Kahn, Founder
- Sonia Lee, Co-Founder
