= Manufacture Modules Technologies =

Manufacture Modules Technologies (MMT)
- Type: SARL
- Industry: Wireless, Life Sciences, Biotech, Horology
- Founded: 2015
- Headquarters: Geneva
- Key people: Philippe Fraboulet, CEO
- Website: www.mmt.ch

Manufacture Modules Technologies Sarl (MMT) is a Swiss company established in Geneva in 2015 which originally specialised in the development and commercialization of "Horological Smartwatch modules", firmware, apps and cloud. Located at Geneva's Skylab high-tech hub, it expanded into the development and manufacturing of "E-Straps" operated with a mobile application.

Philippe Fraboulet is the CEO.

== History ==
In June 2015, Fullpower Technologies and Union Horlogère Suisse (Swiss Watchmakers Corporation) formed MMT as a joint venture, which then launched the MotionX Horological Smartwatch Open Platform for the Swiss watch industry. The initial licensees were Frederique Constant, Alpina and Mondaine, brands owned by Union Horlogère Suisse. Fullpower created and managed the circuit design, firmware, smartphone applications (including sleep activity), as well as the cloud infrastructure. MMT managed the Swiss watch movement development and production as well as licensing and support.

In July 2016, Union Horlogere Holding and MMT were spun-out of the Frédérique Constant Group.

Fullpower Technologies' 19.99% share was acquired by Union Horlogere Holding BV, giving it 100% of MMT's shares.

== Business ==
The company offers firmware, a cloud, manufacturing, service and over-the-air facilities for upgrades. The company also offers its own apps, which bear the label “Swiss Made software”.
