= Friese Buurt =

- Hamlet
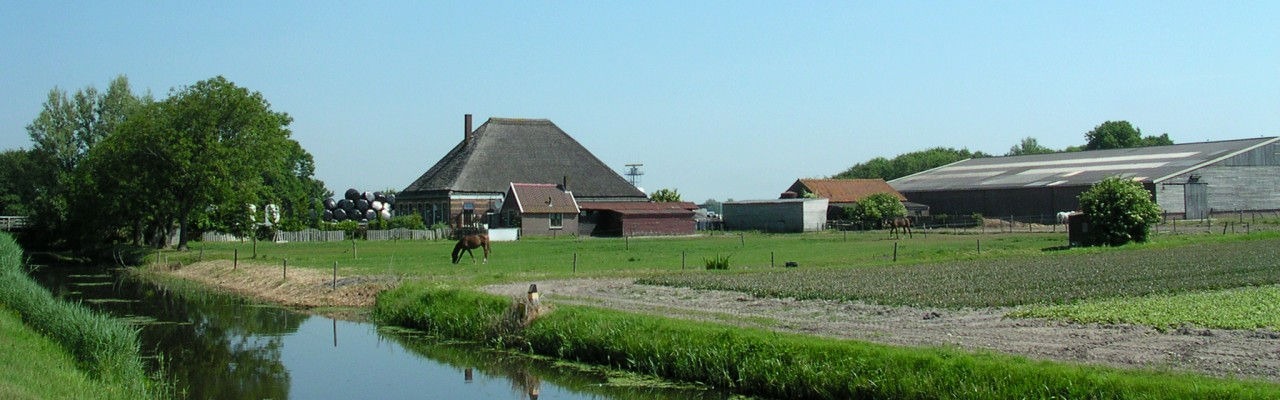
- Farm in Friese Buurt

- Location within Netherlands Location within North Holland
- Coordinates: 52°55′18″N 4°46′25″E
- Country: Netherlands
- Province: North Holland
- Municipality: Den Helder

Area
  - Total: 1.34 km^{2} (0.52 sq mi)
- Elevation: 0.3 m (0.98 ft)

Population (2025)
  - Total: 90
  - Density: 67/km^{2} (170/sq mi)
- Time zone: UTC+1 (CET)
  - Summer (DST): UTC+2 (CEST)
- Postal code: 1786
- Dialing code: 0223

Friese Buurt is a hamlet in the Dutch province of North Holland. It is a part of the municipality of Den Helder, and lies about 3 km south of the Den Helder city centre. The name ("Frisian Neighbourhood") refers to the Frisian farmers who moved here after this area was reclaimed from the sea. The place name signs of the hamlet read Den Helder.
