= Syniverse =

American telecommunications company

Syniverse Technologies
- Company type: Private
- Industry: Telecommunications
- Founded: 1987 (as a division of GTE); February 15, 1989 (as an independent company)
- Headquarters: 8125 Highwoods Palm Way, Tampa, Florida 33647, United States
- Key people: Andrew Davies, CEO
- Products: List
- Owner: The Carlyle Group; Twilio
- Number of employees: 1,400+ (2024)
- Website: Syniverse.com

Syniverse is an American communications technology company with a focus on 5G roaming, communications platform as a service (CPaaS), A2P Messaging, roaming clearing and settlement, IPX, fraud prevention, mobile identify and authentication solutions, IoT, Private Networks and other emerging technologies leveraged by global enterprises and telecommunication carriers.

Syniverse was the first to adopt and support the Billing and Charging Evolution (BCE) standard for wholesale roaming billing and has deployed Universal Commerce for 90% of BCE-compliant international mobile operators.

Headquartered in Tampa, Florida, Syniverse has offices in the United Kingdom, Hong Kong, Costa Rica, Luxembourg, India, China, the United Arab Emirates and Japan. Today it is primarily owned by The Carlyle Group and Twilio and led by Andrew Davies, CEO.

== History ==
Syniverse was established in 1987 as a GTE business unit, GTE Telecommunication Services Inc. (GTE TSI). Soon after, the company launched voice clearing, settlement and exchange, post-call validation, and message rating services. During the following years, it established several call delivery, fraud and roaming products. In 1993, it developed the first wireless SS7 network to support intelligent network-based services.

In 1998, the company began to offer its services globally, providing interoperability services to Australia, China, Japan and Korea. It received an international leadership award two years later for expansion between Korea, Hong Kong, Japan and North America.

In 2000, the company became a wholly owned subsidiary of Verizon Information Services Inc. In 2001, the company changed its name from GTE TSI Telecommunication Services Inc. to Verizon Telecommunication Services Inc. That year, the company introduced some services. One was a global GRX service for GPRS users to access mobile Internet services. Another was a suite of mobile data services, including international SMS interoperability.

In 2002, TSI became an independent, private corporation after being acquired by a private investment group changing its name again to just Telecommunication Services Inc. In 2004, the company changed its corporate name to Syniverse Technologies.

On Feb. 10, 2005, Syniverse became a public company, trading on the New York Stock Exchange under the symbol SVR. Also in 2005, the company developed a platform to distribute wireless Amber alert messages about missing children in the United States; offered the first 1xRTT/1xEV-DO solution to enable mobile data roaming for CDMA subscribers; and became a founding investor, board member and technical participant of dotMobi, the registry for the .mobi domain.

In 2006, Syniverse acquired Interactive Technology Holdings Limited (ITHL), expanding the company’s customer base in Asia Pacific and adding new products. The following year, Syniverse was appointed to provide wireless number portability services to both Singapore and Canada, and acquired the wireless data and financial clearing business of Billing Services Group Limited (BSG).

In 2009, Syniverse became part of Standard & Poor’s Midcap 400 under the Global Industry Classification Index (GCIS) Wireless Telecommunications Services Sub-industry index and was selected as one of two companies selected to provide mobile number portability in India. Syniverse also acquired Wireless Solutions International (WSI) in 2009 and VeriSign, Inc.’s (NASDAQ:VRSN) Messaging and Mobile Media Services.

Syniverse began delivering text messages free of charge to pregnant and expecting mothers with the Text4baby initiative in 2010. In that same year, the company was chosen by CTIA - The Wireless Association to support the Latin America common short code (CSC) initiative. Syniverse uses its web-based platform to incorporate registry, CSC search and payment functionality.

On January 13, 2011, Syniverse became a private corporation after being acquired by an affiliate of The Carlyle Group for approximately $2.6 billion. At Mobile World Congress 2011 in Barcelona, Spain, Syniverse unveiled its Mobile Video Broadcast Service, a video communication solution that claims to be interoperable across platforms, devices and networks. It claims to enable people to send live video to mobile handsets, PCs and social networks and deliver live peer-to-peer video communication.

On March 1, 2021, Twilio invested $750 million to become an owner of minority stake of Syniverse.

On March 17, 2021, Syniverse announced the appointment of Andrew Davies as CEO. He previously served as the company's chief and financial administrative officer.

On Jun 23, 2021, Bloomberg reported that Carlyle-backed Syniverse was in talks to go public through a merger with M3-Brigade Acquisition II Corp., according to people with knowledge of the matter. On August 17, 2021, Syniverse agreed to a merger with special-purpose acquisition company M3-Brigade Acquisition II Corp. Upon completion of the deal, Syniverse will become a publicly traded company on the NYSE. The merger values the combined company at $2.8 billion.

On 27 September 2021, Syniverse informed the U.S. Securities and Exchange Commission of a hack to its Electronic Data Transfer (EDT) systems, affecting "approximately 235 of its customers".
