= Pascal (programming language) =

Programming language

- Paradigm: Imperative; structured
- Family: Wirth Pascal
- Designed by: Niklaus Wirth
- First appeared: 1970; 56 years ago
- Typing discipline: Static; strong; safe
- Scope: Lexical
- Filename extensions: .pas

Major implementations
- BSD; CDC 6000; Embarcadero Delphi; ICL 1900; Pascal-P; PDP-11; PDP-10; IBM System/370; VSI Pascal; Free Pascal; GNU Pascal

Dialects
- Delphi; Free Pascal; Turbo Pascal; UCSD Pascal

Influenced by
- ALGOL W; Simula 67

Influenced
- Ada; C/AL; C#; Component Pascal; Go; Java; Nim; Modula / -2 / -3; Oberon / -2; Object Pascal; Oxygene; Pillar; Power Fx; Standard ML; Structured text; VHDL

Pascal is an imperative and procedural programming language, designed by Niklaus Wirth as a small, efficient language intended to encourage good programming practices using structured programming and data structuring. It is named after French mathematician, philosopher and physicist Blaise Pascal. (Note: In an issue of Electronics in 1978, Wirth explained why he named the language after Blaise Pascal: "Actually, I am neither capable of fully understanding his philosophy nor of appreciating his religious exaltations. Pascal, however, was (perhaps one of) the first to invent and construct a device that we now classify as a digital computer.")

Pascal was developed on the pattern of the ALGOL 60 language. Wirth was involved in the process to improve the language as part of the ALGOL X efforts and proposed a version named ALGOL W. This was not accepted, and the ALGOL X process bogged down. In 1968, Wirth decided to abandon the ALGOL X process and further improve ALGOL W, releasing this as Pascal in 1970.

On top of ALGOL's scalars and arrays, Pascal enables defining complex data types and building dynamic and recursive data structures such as lists, trees and graphs. Pascal has strong typing on all objects, which means that one type of data cannot be converted to or interpreted as another without explicit conversions. Unlike C (and also unlike most other languages in the C family), Pascal allows nested procedure definitions to any depth, and allows most kinds of definitions and declarations inside subroutines (procedures and functions). A program is thus syntactically similar to a single procedure or function. This is similar to the block structure of ALGOL 60, but restricted from arbitrary block statements to just procedures and functions.

Pascal became very successful in the 1970s, notably on the burgeoning minicomputer market. Compilers were also available for many microcomputers as the field emerged in the late 1970s. It was widely used as a teaching language in university-level programming courses in the 1980s, and also used in production settings for writing commercial software during the same period. It was displaced by the C programming language during the late 1980s and early 1990s as UNIX-based systems became popular, and especially with the release of C++.

A derivative named Object Pascal designed for object-oriented programming was developed in 1985. This was used by Apple Computer (for the Lisa and Macintosh machines) and Borland in the late 1980s and later developed into Delphi on the Microsoft Windows platform. Extensions to the Pascal concepts led to the languages Modula-2 and Oberon, both developed by Wirth.

== History ==
=== Earlier efforts ===
Much of the history of computer language design during the 1960s can be traced to the ALGOL 60 language. ALGOL was developed during the 1950s with the explicit goal of being able to clearly describe algorithms. It included a number of features for structured programming that remain common in languages to this day.

Shortly after its introduction, in 1962, Wirth began working on his dissertation with Helmut Weber on the Euler programming language. Euler was based on ALGOL's syntax and many concepts but was not a derivative. Its primary goal was to add dynamic lists and types, allowing it to be used in roles similar to Lisp. The language was published in 1965.

By this time, a number of problems in ALGOL had been identified, notably the lack of a standardized string system. The group tasked with maintaining the language had begun the ALGOL X process to identify improvements, calling for submissions. Wirth and Tony Hoare submitted a conservative set of modifications to add strings and clean up some of the syntax. These were considered too minor to be worth using as the new standard ALGOL, so Wirth wrote a compiler for the language, which became named ALGOL W.

The ALGOL X efforts would go on to choose a much more complex language, ALGOL 68. The complexity of this language led to considerable difficulty producing high-performance compilers, and it was not widely used in the industry. This left an opening for newer languages.

=== Pascal ===
Pascal was influenced by the ALGOL W efforts, with the explicit goals of teaching programming in a structured fashion and for the development of system software. A generation of students used Pascal as an introductory language in undergraduate courses. Other goals included providing a reliable and efficient tool for writing large programs, and bridging the canyon between scientific and commercial programming, as represented by the then-widespread languages Fortran and COBOL, with a general-purpose language.

One of the early successes for the language was the introduction of University of California, San Diego's (UCSD) UCSD Pascal, a version that ran on a custom operating system that could be ported to different platforms. A key platform was the Apple II, where it saw widespread use as Apple Pascal. This led to Pascal becoming the primary high-level language used for development in the Apple Lisa, and later, the Macintosh. Parts of the original Macintosh operating system were hand-translated into Motorola 68000 assembly language from the Pascal source code.

The typesetting system TeX by Donald Knuth was written in WEB, the original literate programming system, based on Digital Equipment Corporation (DEC) PDP-10 Pascal. Successful commercial applications like Adobe Photoshop were written in Macintosh Programmer's Workshop Pascal, while applications like Total Commander, Skype and Macromedia Captivate were written in Delphi (Object Pascal). Apollo Computer used Pascal as the systems programming language for its operating systems beginning in 1980.

Variants of Pascal have also been used for everything from research projects to PC games and embedded systems. Newer Pascal compilers exist which are widely used.

=== Dialects ===
Wirth's example compiler meant to propagate the language, the Pascal-P system, used a subset of the language designed to be the minimal subset of the language that could compile itself. The idea was that this could allow bootstrapping the compiler, which would then be extended to full Pascal language status. This was done with several compilers, but one notable exception was UCSD Pascal, which was based on Pascal-P2. It kept the subset status of the language based on the idea that this would run better on the new (then) microprocessors with limited memory. UCSD also converted the Pascal-P2 interpreter into a "byte machine", again, because it would be a better fit for byte-oriented microprocessors.

UCSD Pascal formed the basis of many systems, including Apple Pascal. Borland Pascal was not based on the UCSD codebase, but arrived during the popular period of UCSD and matched many of its features. This started the line that ended with Delphi Pascal and the compatible Open Source compiler FPC/Lazarus.

The ISO standard for Pascal, ISO 7185, was published in 1983 and was widely implemented and used on mainframes, minicomputers and IBM-PCs and compatibles from 16 bits to 32 bits. The two dialects of Pascal most in use towards the end of the 20th century and up until today are the ISO 7185 standard version and the Delphi/Turbo Pascal versions (of which the two Borland versions are mostly compatible with each other).

The source for much of the early history on Pascal can be found in the Pascal User's Group newsletters at:

Pascal Users Group Newsletters.

=== Object Pascal ===
During work on the Lisa, Larry Tesler began corresponding with Wirth on the idea of adding object-oriented extensions to the language, to make Pascal a multi-paradigm programming language. This led initially to Clascal, introduced in 1983. As the Lisa program faded and was replaced by the Macintosh, a further version was created and named Object Pascal. This was introduced on the Mac in 1985 as part of the MacApp application framework, and became Apple's main development language into the early 1990s.

The Object Pascal extensions were added to Turbo Pascal with the release of version 5.5 in 1989. Over the years, Object Pascal became the basis of the Delphi system for Microsoft Windows, which is still used for developing Windows applications, and can cross-compile code to other systems. Free Pascal is an open source, cross-platform alternative with its own graphical integrated development environment (IDE) named Lazarus.

== Implementations ==
=== Early compilers ===
The first Pascal compiler was designed in Zürich for the CDC 6000 series mainframe computer family. Niklaus Wirth reports that a first attempt to implement it in FORTRAN 66 in 1969 was unsuccessful due to FORTRAN 66's inadequacy to express complex data structures. The second attempt was implemented in a C-like language (Scallop by Max Engeli) and then translated by hand (by R. Schild) to Pascal itself for boot-strapping. It was operational by mid-1970. Many Pascal compilers since have been similarly self-hosting, that is, the compiler is itself written in Pascal, and the compiler is usually capable of recompiling itself when new features are added to the language, or when the compiler is to be ported to a new environment. The GNU Pascal compiler is one notable exception, being written in C.

The first successful port of the CDC Pascal compiler to another mainframe was completed by Welsh and Quinn at the Queen's University of Belfast (QUB) in 1972. The target was the International Computers Limited (ICL) 1900 series. This compiler, in turn, was the parent of the Pascal compiler for the Information Computer Systems (ICS) Multum minicomputer. The Multum port was developed – with a view to using Pascal as a systems programming language – by Findlay, Cupples, Cavouras and Davis, working at the Department of Computing Science in Glasgow University. It is thought that Multum Pascal, which was completed in the summer of 1973, may have been the first 16-bit implementation.

A completely new compiler was completed by Welsh et al. at QUB in 1977. It offered a source-language diagnostic feature (incorporating profiling, tracing and type-aware formatted postmortem dumps) that was implemented by Findlay and Watt at Glasgow University. This implementation was ported in 1980 to the ICL 2900 series by a team based at Southampton University and Glasgow University. The Standard Pascal Model Implementation was also based on this compiler, having been adapted, by Welsh and Hay at Manchester University in 1984, to check rigorously for conformity to the BSI 6192/ISO 7185 Standard and to generate code for a portable abstract machine.

The first Pascal compiler written in North America was constructed at the University of Illinois under Donald B. Gillies for the PDP-11 and generated native machine code. Microsoft had Pascal compilers for IBM PCs; see Microsoft Pascal.

=== The Pascal-P system ===
To propagate the language rapidly, a compiler porting kit was created in Zürich that included a compiler that generated so-called p-code for a virtual stack machine, i.e., code that lends itself to reasonably efficient interpretation, along with an interpreter for that code – the Pascal-P system. The P-system compilers were named Pascal-P1, Pascal-P2, Pascal-P3, and Pascal-P4. Pascal-P1 was the first version, and Pascal-P4 was the last to come from Zürich. The version termed Pascal-P1 was coined after the fact for the many different sources for Pascal-P that existed. The compiler was redesigned to enhance portability, and issued as Pascal-P2. This code was later enhanced to become Pascal-P3, with an intermediate code backward compatible with Pascal-P2, and Pascal-P4, which was not backward compatible.

The Pascal-P4 compiler–interpreter can still be run and compiled on systems compatible with original Pascal (as can Pascal-P2). However, it only accepts a subset of the Pascal language.

Pascal-P5, created outside the Zürich group, accepts the full Pascal language and includes ISO 7185 compatibility.

Pascal-P6 is a follow-on to Pascal-P5 that, along with other features, aims to be a compiler for specific CPUs, including AMD64.

UCSD Pascal branched off Pascal-P2, where Kenneth Bowles used it to create the interpretive UCSD p-System. It was one of three operating systems available at the launch of the original IBM Personal Computer. UCSD Pascal used an intermediate code based on byte values, and thus was one of the earliest bytecode compilers. Apple Pascal was released in 1979 for the Apple II and Apple III computer systems. It was an implementation of, or largely based on, UCSD Pascal. Pascal-P1 through Pascal-P4 were not, but rather based on the CDC 6600 60-bit word length.

A compiler based on the Pascal-P4 compiler, which created native binary object files, was released for the IBM System/370 mainframe computer by the Australian Atomic Energy Commission; it was named the AAEC Pascal 8000 Compiler after the abbreviation of the name of the commission.

=== Object Pascal and Turbo Pascal ===
Apple Computer created its own Lisa Pascal for the Lisa Workshop in 1982, and ported the compiler to the Apple Macintosh and MPW in 1985. In 1985 Larry Tesler, in consultation with Niklaus Wirth, defined Object Pascal and these extensions were incorporated in both the Lisa Pascal and Mac Pascal compilers.

In the 1980s, Anders Hejlsberg wrote the Blue Label Pascal compiler for the Nascom-2. A reimplementation of this compiler for the IBM PC was marketed under the names Compas Pascal and PolyPascal before it was acquired by Borland and renamed Turbo Pascal.

Turbo Pascal became hugely popular, thanks to an aggressive pricing strategy, having one of the first full-screen IDEs, and very fast turnaround time (just seconds to compile, link, and run). It was written and highly optimized entirely in assembly language, making it smaller and faster than much of the competition.

In 1986, Anders ported Turbo Pascal to the Macintosh and incorporated Apple's Object Pascal extensions into Turbo Pascal. These extensions were then added back into the PC version of Turbo Pascal for version 5.5. At the same time Microsoft also implemented the Object Pascal compiler. Turbo Pascal 5.5 had a large influence on the Pascal community, which began concentrating mainly on the IBM PC in the late 1980s. Many PC hobbyists in search of a structured replacement for BASIC used this product. It also began to be adopted by professional developers. Around the same time a number of concepts were imported from C to let Pascal programmers use the C-based application programming interface (API) of Microsoft Windows directly. These extensions included null-terminated strings, pointer arithmetic, function pointers, an address-of operator, and unsafe typecasts.

Turbo Pascal and other derivatives with unit or module structures are modular programming languages. However, it does not provide a nested module concept or qualified import and export of specific symbols.

=== Other variants ===
Super Pascal adds non-numeric labels, a return statement and expressions as names of types.

TMT Pascal was the first Borland-compatible compiler for 32-bit MS-DOS compatible protected mode, OS/2, and Win32. It extends the language with function and operator overloading.

The universities of Wisconsin–Madison, Zürich, Karlsruhe, and Wuppertal developed the Pascal-SC and Pascal-XSC (Extensions for Scientific Computation) compilers, aimed at programming numerical computations. Development for Pascal-SC started in 1978 supporting ISO 7185 Pascal level 0, but level 2 support was added at a later stage. Pascal-SC originally targeted the Z80 processor, but was later rewritten for DOS (x86) and 68000. Pascal-XSC has at various times been ported to Unix (Linux, SunOS, HP-UX, AIX) and Microsoft/IBM (DOS with EMX, OS/2, Windows) operating systems. It operates by generating intermediate C source code which is then compiled to a native executable. Some of the Pascal-SC language extensions have been adopted by GNU Pascal.

Pascal Sol was designed around 1983 by a French team to implement a Unix-like system named Sol. It was standard Pascal level-1 (with parameterized array bounds) but the definition allowed alternative keywords and predefined identifiers in French and the language included a few extensions to ease system programming (e.g. an equivalent to lseek). The Sol team later on moved to the ChorusOS project to design a distributed operating system.

IP Pascal is an implementation of the Pascal programming language using Micropolis DOS, but was moved rapidly to CP/M-80 running on the Z80. It was moved to the 80386 machine types in 1994, and exists today as Windows XP and Linux implementations. In 2008, the system was brought up to a new level and the resulting language termed "Pascaline" (after Pascal's calculator). It includes objects, namespace controls, dynamic arrays, and many other extensions, and generally features the same functionality and type protection as C#. It is the only such implementation that is also compatible with the original Pascal implementation, which is standardized as ISO 7185.

== Language constructs ==
Pascal, in its original form, is a purely procedural language and includes the traditional array of ALGOL-like control structures with reserved words such as if, then, else, while, for, and case, ranging on a single statement or a begin-end statements block. Pascal also has data structuring constructs not included in the original ALGOL 60 types, like records, variants, pointers, enumerations, and sets and procedure pointers. Such constructs were in part inherited or inspired from Simula 67, ALGOL 68, Niklaus Wirth's own ALGOL W and suggestions by C. A. R. Hoare.

Pascal programs start with the program keyword with a list of external file descriptors as parameters (not required in Turbo Pascal etc.); then follows the main block bracketed by the begin and end keywords. Semicolons separate statements, and the full stop (i.e., a period) ends the whole program (or unit). Letter case is ignored in Pascal source.

Here is an example of the source code in use for a very simple "Hello, World!" program:

program HelloWorld(output);
begin
    WriteLn('Hello, World!')
    {No ";" is required after the last statement of a block -
        adding one adds a "null statement" to the program, which is ignored by the compiler.}
end.

=== Data types ===
A type declaration in Pascal is used to define a range of values which a variable of that type is capable of storing. It also defines a set of operations that are permissible to be performed on variables of that type. The predefined types are:

Data type	Type of values which the variable is capable of storing
integer	integer (whole) numbers
real	floating-point numbers
Boolean	the values True or False
char	a single character from an ordered character set
set	equivalent to an array of Boolean values
array	a countable group of any of the preceding data types, of records, or of other arrays
record	A collection of any of the preceding data types or of other records
string	a sequence or "string" of characters is declared as a "packed array of char" with a starting index of 1. These can be assigned string constants and individual characters can be accessed as elements of the array.

The range of values allowed for the basic types (except Boolean) is implementation defined. Functions are provided for some data conversions. For conversion of real to integer, the following functions are available: round (using rounding half away from zero) and trunc (rounds towards zero).

The programmer has the freedom to define other commonly used data types (e.g. byte, string, etc.) in terms of the predefined types using Pascal's type declaration facility, for example

type
    byte        = 0..255;
    signed_byte = -128..127;
    string      = packed array[1..255] of char;

Often-used types like byte and string are already defined in many implementations.

Normally the system will use a word to store the data. For instance, the byte type may be stored in a machine integer—32 bits perhaps—rather than an 8-bit value. Pascal does not contain language elements that allow the basic storage types to be defined more granularly. This capability was included in a number of Pascal extensions and follow-on languages, while others, like Modula-2, expanded the built-in set to cover most machine data types like 16-bit integers.

The packed keyword tells the compiler to use the most efficient method of storage for the structured data types: sets, arrays and records, rather than using one word for each element. Packing may slow access on machines that do not offer easy access to parts of a word.

=== Subrange types ===
Subranges of any ordinal data type (any simple type except real) can also be made:

var
    x : 1..10;
    y : 'a'..'z';

=== Set types ===
In contrast with other programming languages from its time, Pascal supports a set type:

var
    Set1 : set of 1..10;
    Set2 : set of 'a'..'z';

A set is a fundamental concept for modern mathematics, and they may be used in many algorithms. Such a feature is useful and may be faster than an equivalent construct in a language that does not support sets. For example, for many Pascal compilers:

if i in [5..10] then ...

executes faster than:

if (i > 4) and (i < 11) then ...

Sets of non-contiguous values can be particularly useful, in terms of both performance and readability:

if i in [0..3, 7, 9, 12..15] then ...

For these examples, which involve sets over small domains, the improved performance is usually achieved by the compiler representing set variables as bit vectors. The set operators can then be implemented efficiently as bitwise machine code operations.

=== Record types ===
A record is a structure comprising any number of member elements called fields. Fields are defined by specifying an identifier–data type pair delimited by a colon; nested records are possible. The field list is then terminated by the end keyword. A record variable's fields can later be accessed by inserting a dot (.) between the record name and the field identifiers. An example of a Pascal record type:

type
     car = record
         Width: integer;
         Length: integer
     end;

A record may also consist of variants, which are constants defined by a parenthesized list of field declarations. A case ... of clause is used at the end of the record to declare the variable part, containing the number of variants of the type specified within the clause. An example of a variant record type:

type
     Shape = (Circle, Square, Triangle);
     Dimensions = record
        case Figure: Shape of 
           Circle: (Diameter: real);
           Square: (Width: real);
           Triangle: (Side: real; Angle1, Angle2: 0..360)
     end;

Variant records allow several fields of the record to overlap each other to save memory.

=== Type declarations ===
Types can be defined from other types using type declarations:

type
    x = integer;
    y = x;
...

Further, complex types can be constructed from simple types:

type
    a = array[1..10] of integer;
    b = record
        x : integer;
        y : char  {extra semicolon not strictly required}
    end;
    c = file of a;

Further, complex types can be constructed from other complex types recursively:

const
  Jack  = 11;
  Queen = 12;
  King  = 13;
  Ace   = 14;

type		   
  valueType = 2..Ace;             
  suitType  = club, diamond, heart, spade;

  cardType  = record
                suit:   suitType; 
                value:  valueType;
              end;

  deckType = array [1..52] of cardType;

  person = record
             surname: packed array [1..20] of char; 
			 age: integer;
		   end;

  table = record 
            hands: array [1..3] of deckType;
			players: array [1..4] of person;
          end;

=== File type ===
type
    a = file of integer;
    b = record
        x : integer;
        y : char
    end;
    c = file of b;

As shown in the example above, Pascal files are sequences of components. Every file has a buffer variable which is denoted by f^. The procedures get (for reading) and put (for writing) move the buffer variable to the next element. Read is introduced such that read(f, x) is the same as x := f^; get(f);. Write is introduced such that write(f, x) is the same as f^ := x; put(f); The type text is predefined as file of char. While the buffer variable could be used for inspecting the next character to be used (check for a digit before reading an integer), this leads to serious problems with interactive programs in early implementations, but was solved later with the "lazy I/O" concept, which waits until the file buffer variable is actually accessed before performing file operations.

=== Pointer types ===
Pascal supports pointers:

type
    pNode = ^Node;
    Node  = record
        a : integer;
        b : char;
        c : pNode  
    end;
var
    NodePtr : pNode;
    IntPtr  : ^integer;

Here the variable NodePtr is a pointer to the data type Node, a record. Pointers to not-yet-defined types can be declared (in the above example, pNode is a pointer to a Node, but Node is not yet defined when the pointer type is defined). This is a forward declaration, an exception to the rule that things must be declared before they are used.

To create a new record and assign the value 10 and character A to the fields a and b in the record, and to initialise the pointer c to the null pointer ("NIL" in Pascal), the statements would be:

new(NodePtr);
...
NodePtr^.a := 10;
NodePtr^.b := 'A';
NodePtr^.c := nil;
...

This could also be done using the with statement, as follows:

new(NodePtr);
...
with NodePtr^ do
begin
    a := 10;
    b := 'A';
    c := nil
end;
...

Inside of the scope of the with statement, a and b refer to the subfields of the record pointer NodePtr and not to the record Node or the pointer type pNode.

Linked lists, stacks and queues can be created by including a pointer type field (c) in the record.

Unlike many languages that feature pointers, Pascal only allows pointers to reference dynamically created variables that are anonymous, and does not allow them to reference standard static or local variables. Pointers also must have an associated type, and a pointer to one type is not compatible with a pointer to another type (e.g. a pointer to a char is not compatible with a pointer to an integer). This helps eliminate the type security issues inherent with other pointer implementations, particularly those used for PL/I or C. It also removes some risks caused by dangling pointers, but the ability to dynamically deallocate referenced space by using the dispose function (which has the same effect as the free library function found in C) means that the risk of dangling pointers has not been eliminated as it has in languages such as Java and C#, which provide automatic garbage collection (but which do not eliminate the related problem of memory leaks).

Some of these restrictions can be lifted in newer dialects.

=== Control structures ===
Pascal is a structured programming language, meaning that the flow of control is structured into standard statements, usually without "goto" commands.

while a <> b do  WriteLn('Waiting');

if a > b then WriteLn('Condition met')   {no semicolon allowed before else}
    else WriteLn('Condition not met');

for i := 1 to 10 do  {no semicolon here as it would detach the next statement}
    WriteLn('Iteration: ', i);

repeat
    a := a + 1
until a = 10;

case i of
    0 : Write('zero');
    1 : Write('one');
    2 : Write('two');
    3,4,5,6,7,8,9,10: Write('?')
end;

=== Procedures and functions ===
Pascal structures programs into procedures and functions. Generally, a procedure is used for its side effects, whereas a function is used for its return value.

program Printing(output);

var i : integer;

procedure PrintAnInteger(j : integer);
begin
    ...
end;

function triple(x: integer): integer;
begin
	triple := x * 3
end;

begin { main program }
    ...
    PrintAnInteger(i);
    PrintAnInteger(triple(i))
end.

Procedures and functions can be nested to any depth, and the "program" construct is the logical outermost block.

By default, parameters are passed by value. If "var" precedes a parameter's name, it is passed by reference.

Each procedure or function can have its own declarations of goto labels, constants, types, variables, and other procedures and functions, which must all be in that order. This ordering requirement was originally intended to allow efficient single-pass compilation. However, in some dialects (such as Delphi) the strict ordering requirement of declaration sections has been relaxed.

=== Semicolons as statement separators ===
Pascal adopted many language syntax features from the ALGOL language, including the use of a semicolon as a statement separator. This is in contrast to other languages, such as PL/I and C, which use the semicolon as a statement terminator. No semicolon is needed before the end keyword of a record type declaration, a block, or a case statement; before the until keyword of a repeat statement; and before the else keyword of an if statement.

The presence of an extra semicolon was not permitted in early versions of Pascal. However, the addition of ALGOL-like empty statements in the 1973 Revised Report and later changes to the language in ISO 7185:1983 now allow for optional semicolons in most of these cases. A semicolon is still not permitted immediately before the else keyword in an if statement, because the else follows a single statement, not a statement sequence. In nested ifs, a semicolon cannot be used to avoid the dangling else problem (where the inner if does not have an else, but the outer if does) by putatively terminating the nested if with a semicolon – this instead terminates both if clauses. Instead, an explicit begin...end block must be used.

== Resources ==
=== Compilers and interpreters ===
Several Pascal compilers and interpreters are available for general use:

- Delphi is Embarcadero's (formerly Borland/CodeGear) flagship rapid application development (RAD) product. It uses the Object Pascal language (termed "Delphi" by Borland), descended from Pascal, to create applications for Windows, macOS, iOS, and Android. The .NET support that existed from D8 through D2005, D2006, and D2007 has been terminated, and replaced by a new language (Prism, which is rebranded Oxygene; see below) that is not fully backward compatible. In recent years Unicode support and generics were added (D2009, D2010, Delphi XE).
- Free Pascal is a cross-platform compiler written in Object Pascal (and is self-hosting). It is aimed at providing a convenient and powerful compiler, able to both compile legacy applications and be the means to develop new ones. It is distributed under the GNU General Public License (GNU GPL), while packages and runtime library come under a modified GNU Lesser General Public License (GNU LGPL). In addition to compatibility modes for Turbo Pascal, Delphi, and Mac Pascal, it has its own procedural and object-oriented syntax modes with support for extended features such as operator overloading. It supports many platforms and operating systems. Current versions also feature an ISO mode.
- Turbo51 is a free Pascal compiler for the Intel 8051 family of microcontrollers, with Turbo Pascal 7 syntax.
- Oxygene (formerly named Chrome) is an Object Pascal compiler for the .NET and Mono platforms. It was created and is sold by RemObjects Software, and sold for a while by Embarcadero as the back-end compiler of Prism.
- Kylix was a descendant of Delphi, with support for the Linux operating system and an improved object library. It is no longer supported. Compiler and IDE are available now for non-commercial use.
- GNU Pascal Compiler (GPC) is the Pascal compiler of the GNU Compiler Collection (GCC). The compiler is written in C, and the runtime library mostly in Pascal. Distributed under the GNU General Public License, it runs on many platforms and operating systems. It supports the ANSI/ISO standard languages and has partial Turbo Pascal dialect support. One of the more notable omissions is the absence of a fully Turbo Pascal-compatible (short)string type. Support for Borland Delphi and other language variants is quite limited. There is some support for Mac-pascal, however.
- Virtual Pascal was created by Vitaly Miryanov in 1995 as a native OS/2 compiler compatible with Borland Pascal syntax. Then, it had been commercially developed by fPrint, adding Win32 support, and in 2000 it became freeware. Today it can compile for Win32, OS/2, and Linux, and is mostly compatible with Borland Pascal and Delphi. Development was canceled on April 4, 2005.
- Pascal-P4 compiler is the basis for many Pascal-implemented-in-Pascal compilers. It implements a subset of full Pascal.
- Pascal-P5 compiler is an ISO 7185 (full Pascal) adaption of Pascal-P4.
- Pascal-P6 compiler is an extended version of Pascal adaption of Pascal-P5 according to the Pascaline language specification.
- Smart Mobile Studio is a Pascal-to-HTML5/JavaScript compiler.
- Turbo Pascal was the dominant Pascal compiler for PCs during the 1980s and early 1990s, popular because of both its powerful extensions and extremely short compilation times. Turbo Pascal was compactly written and could compile, run, and debug all from memory without accessing disk. Slow floppy disk drives were common for programmers at the time, further magnifying Turbo Pascal's speed advantage. Currently, older versions of Turbo Pascal (up to 5.5) are available for free download from Borland's site.
- IP Pascal implements the language "Pascaline" (named after Pascal's calculator), which is a highly extended Pascal compatible with original Pascal according to ISO 7185. It features modules with namespace control, including parallel tasking modules with semaphores, objects, dynamic arrays of any dimensions that are allocated at runtime, overloads, overrides, and many other extensions. IP Pascal has a built-in portability library that is tailored to the Pascal language. For example, a standard text output application from 1970's original Pascal can be recompiled to work in a window and even have graphical constructs added.
- Pascal-XT was created by Siemens for their mainframe operating systems BS2000 and SINIX.
- PocketStudio is a Pascal subset compiler and rapid application development (RAD) tool for Palm OS and MC68xxx processors with some of its own extensions to assist interfacing with the Palm OS API. It resembles Delphi and Lazarus with a visual form designer, an object inspector and a source code editor.
- MIDletPascal – A Pascal compiler and IDE that generates small and fast Java bytecode specifically designed to create software for mobiles.
- Vector Pascal is a language for SIMD instruction sets such as the MMX and the AMD 3d Now, supporting all Intel and AMD processors, and Sony's PlayStation 2 Emotion Engine.
- Morfik Pascal allows the development of web applications entirely written in Object Pascal (both server and browser side).
- WDSibyl – Visual Development Environment and Pascal compiler for Win32 and OS/2.
- PP Compiler, a compiler for Palm OS that runs directly on the handheld computer.
- CDC 6000 Pascal compiler is the source code for the first (CDC 6000) Pascal compiler.
- Pascal-S
- AmigaPascal is a free Pascal compiler for Amiga systems.
- VSI Pascal for OpenVMS (formerly HP Pascal for OpenVMS, Compaq Pascal, DEC Pascal, VAX Pascal and originally VAX-11 Pascal) is a Pascal compiler that runs on OpenVMS systems. It was also supported under Tru64. VSI Pascal for OpenVMS is compatible with ISO/IEC 7185:1990 Pascal as well some of ISO/IEC 10206:1990 Extended Pascal, and also includes its own extensions. The compiler front end is implemented in BLISS.
- Stony Brook Pascal+ was a 16-bit (later 32-bit) optimizing compiler for DOS and OS/2, marketed as a direct replacement for Turbo Pascal, but producing code that executed at least twice as fast.

=== IDEs ===
- Dev-Pascal is a Pascal IDE that was designed in Borland Delphi and which supports Free Pascal and GNU Pascal as back ends.
- Lazarus is a free Delphi-like visual cross-platform IDE for rapid application development (RAD). Based on Free Pascal, Lazarus is available for numerous platforms including Linux, FreeBSD, macOS and Microsoft Windows.
- Fire (macOS) and Water (Windows) for the Oxygene and the Elements Compiler

=== Libraries ===
- WOL Library for creating GUI applications with the Free Pascal Compiler.

== Standards ==
=== ISO/IEC 7185:1990 Pascal ===
In 1983, the language was standardized in the international standard IEC/ISO 7185 and several local country-specific standards, including the American ANSI/IEEE770X3.97-1983, and ISO 7185:1983. These two standards differed only in that the ISO standard included a "level 1" extension for conformant arrays (an array where the boundaries of the array are not known until run time), where ANSI did not allow for this extension to the original (Wirth version) language. In 1989, ISO 7185 was revised (ISO 7185:1990) to correct various errors and ambiguities found in the original document.

The ISO 7185 was stated to be a clarification of Wirth's 1974 language as detailed by the User Manual and Report [Jensen and Wirth], but was also notable for adding "Conformant Array Parameters" as a level 1 to the standard, level 0 being Pascal without conformant arrays. This addition was made at the request of C. A. R. Hoare, and with the approval of Niklaus Wirth. The precipitating cause was that Hoare wanted to create a Pascal version of the (NAG) Numerical Algorithms Library, which had originally been written in FORTRAN, and found that it was not possible to do so without an extension that would allow array parameters of varying size. Similar considerations motivated the inclusion in ISO 7185 of the facility to specify the parameter types of procedural and functional parameters.

Niklaus Wirth himself referred to the 1974 language as "the Standard", for example, to differentiate it from the machine specific features of the CDC 6000 compiler. This language was documented in The Pascal Report, the second part of the "Pascal users manual and report".

On the large machines (mainframes and minicomputers) Pascal originated on, the standards were generally followed. On the IBM PC, they were not. On IBM PCs, the Borland standards Turbo Pascal and Delphi have the greatest number of users. Thus, it is typically important to understand whether a particular implementation corresponds to the original Pascal language, or a Borland dialect of it.

The IBM PC versions of the language began to differ with the advent of UCSD Pascal, an interpreted implementation that featured several extensions to the language, along with several omissions and changes. Many UCSD language features survive today, including in Borland's dialect.

=== ISO/IEC 10206:1990 Extended Pascal ===
In 1990, an extended Pascal standard was created as ISO/IEC 10206, which is identical in technical content to IEEE/ANSI 770X3.160-1989 As of 2019, support of Extended Pascal in FreePascal Compiler is planned.

The key feature of Extended Pascal is Modularity and Separate Compilation. Extended Pascal Application source code files can be separated into one "program file" and multiple "module files". Each module file has their own type, constant, variable and procedure/function definitions and programmers can change the order of these "entity definition" areas. Also, there are some module-specific definition areas called "initialization" areas with the statement to begin do ... and "finalization" areas with the statement to end do ..., which can manage the initial state and memory allocation of entities inside the module. By inserting import ... statements between module/program declaration and definition areas, modules can share their own entities with other modules (and programs).

Other major features include variable binding, collections of similar types (Schemata), comprehensive string facilities, complex number type support, otherwise keyword for default branch flow in case statement, and short circuit boolean evaluation.

=== Variations ===
Niklaus Wirth's Zürich version of Pascal was issued outside ETH in two basic forms: the CDC 6000 compiler source, and a porting kit called Pascal-P system. The Pascal-P compiler left out several features of the full language that were not required to bootstrap the compiler. For example, procedures and functions used as parameters, undiscriminated variant records, packing, dispose, interprocedural gotos and other features of the full compiler were omitted.

UCSD Pascal, under Professor Kenneth Bowles, was based on the Pascal-P2 kit, and consequently shared several of the Pascal-P language restrictions. UCSD Pascal was later adopted as Apple Pascal, and continued through several versions there. Although UCSD Pascal expanded the subset Pascal in the Pascal-P kit by adding back standard Pascal constructs, it was still not a complete standard installation of Pascal.

In the early 1990s, Alan Burns and Geoff Davies developed Pascal-FC, an extension to Pl/0 (from Niklaus' book Algorithms + Data Structures = Programs). Several constructs were added to use Pascal-FC as a teaching tool for Concurrent Programming (such as semaphores, monitors, channels, remote-invocation and resources). To be able to demonstrate concurrency, the compiler output (a kind of P-code) could then be executed on a virtual machine. This virtual machine not only simulated a normal – fair – environment, but could also simulate extreme conditions (unfair mode).

==== Borland-like Pascal compilers ====
Borland's Turbo Pascal, written by Anders Hejlsberg, was written in assembly language independent of UCSD and the Zürich compilers. However, it adopted much of the same subset and extensions as the UCSD compiler. This is probably because the UCSD system was the most common Pascal system suitable for developing applications on the resource-limited microprocessor systems available at that time.

The shrink-wrapped Turbo Pascal version 3 and later incarnations, including Borland's Object Pascal and Delphi and non-Borland near-compatibles, became popular with programmers including shareware authors, so the SWAG library of Pascal code features a large amount of code written with such versions as Delphi in mind.

Software products (compilers, and IDE/Rapid Application Development (RAD)) in this category:

- Turbo Pascal – "TURBO.EXE" up to version 7, and Turbo Pascal for Windows ("TPW") and Turbo Pascal for Macintosh.
- Pure Pascal and HiSPeed Pascal 2 Pascal language Environment for the Atari ST range of computers.
- Borland Pascal 7 – A professional version of Turbo Pascal line which targeted both DOS and Windows.
- Object Pascal – an extension of the Pascal language that was developed at Apple Computer by a team led by Larry Tesler in consultation with Niklaus Wirth, the inventor of Pascal; its features were added to Borland's Turbo Pascal for Macintosh and in 1989 for Turbo Pascal 5.5 for DOS.
- Delphi – Object Pascal is essentially its underlying language.
- Free Pascal compiler (FPC) – Free Pascal adopted the standard dialect of Borland Pascal programmers, Borland Turbo Pascal and, later, Delphi.
- PascalABC.NET – a new generation Pascal programming language including compiler and IDE.
- Borland Kylix is a compiler and IDE formerly sold by Borland, but later discontinued. It is a Linux version of the Borland Delphi software development environment and C++Builder.
- Lazarus – similar to Kylix in function, is a free cross-platform visual IDE for RAD using the Free Pascal compiler, which supports dialects of Object Pascal to varying degrees.
- Virtual Pascal – VP2/1 is a fully Borland Pascal– and Borland Delphi–compatible 32-bit Pascal compiler for OS/2 and Windows 32 (with a Linux version "on the way").
- Sybil is an open source Delphi-like IDE and compiler; implementations include:
  - WDSibyl for Microsoft Windows and OS/2, a commercial Borland Pascal compatible environment released by a company named Speedsoft that was later developed into a Delphi-like rapid application development (RAD) environment named Sybil and then open sourced under the GPL when that company closed down;
  - Open Sybil, which is an ongoing project, an open source tool for OS/2 and eCS that was originally based on Speedsoft's WDsybl Sibyl Portable Component Classes (SPCC) and Sibyl Visual Development Tool (SVDE) sources, but now its core is IBM System Object Model (SOM), WPS and OpenDoc.

=== List of related standards ===
- ISO 8651-2:1988 Information processing systems – Computer graphics – Graphical Kernel System (GKS) language bindings – Part 2: Pascal

== Reception ==
Pascal generated a wide variety of responses in the computing community, both critical and complimentary.

=== Early criticism ===
Wirth's initial definition of the language was widely criticized. In particular, Nico Habermann commented in his "Critical Comments on the Programming Language Pascal" (1973) that many of its constructs were poorly defined, in particular for data types, ranges, structures, and goto. Later, Brian Kernighan, who popularized the C language, outlined his criticisms of Pascal in 1981 in his article "Why Pascal is Not My Favorite Programming Language". The most serious problem Kernighan described was that array sizes and string lengths were part of the type, so it was not possible to write a function that would accept variable-length arrays or even strings as parameters. This made it unfeasible to write, for example, a sorting library. Kernighan also criticized the unpredictable order of evaluation of Boolean expressions, poor library support, and lack of static variables, and raised a number of smaller issues. Also, he stated that the language did not provide any simple constructs to "escape" (knowingly and forcibly ignore) restrictions and limitations. More general complaints from other sources noted that the scope of declarations was not clearly defined in the original language definition, which sometimes had serious consequences when using forward declarations to define pointer types, or when record declarations led to mutual recursion, or when an identifier may or may not have been used in an enumeration list. Another difficulty was that, like ALGOL 60, the language did not allow procedures or functions passed as parameters to predefine the expected type of their parameters.

=== Rising popularity in the 1970s and 1980s ===
In the two decades after 1975, Pascal gained increasing attention and became a major programming language for important platforms (including Apple II, Apple III, Apple Lisa, Commodore systems, Z-80-based machines and IBM PC) due to the availability of UCSD Pascal and Turbo Pascal.

Despite initial criticisms, Pascal continued to evolve, and most of Kernighan's points do not apply to versions of the language which were enhanced to be suitable for commercial product development, such as Borland's Turbo Pascal. As Kernighan predicted in his article, most of the extensions to fix these issues were incompatible from compiler to compiler. Since the early 1990s, however, most of the varieties seem condensed into two categories: ISO and Borland-like. Extended Pascal addresses many of these early criticisms. It supports variable-length strings, variable initialization, separate compilation, short-circuit Boolean operators, and default (otherwise) clauses for case statements.

Some of the problems arising from the differences in the implementations of Pascal were later partly solved by the advent of Free Pascal, which supports several dialects with mode directives.

== See also ==
- Camel case – Writing format
- Concurrent Pascal – Programming language
- Comparison of Pascal and C – Comparison of two programming languages
- Comparison of Pascal and Delphi – Programming language
