= Turbo51 =

Pascal compiler

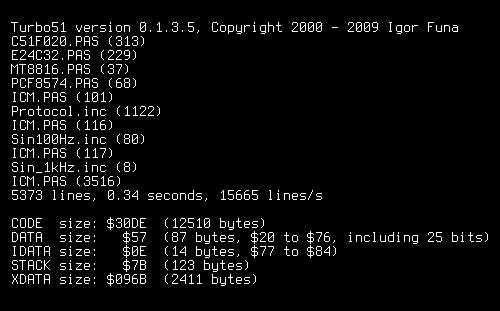
- Turbo51 command line output
- Developer: Igor Funa
- Stable release: 0.1.3.12 / February 1, 2012; 13 years ago
- Operating system: Win32
- Type: Compiler
- License: Freeware
- Website: turbo51.com

Turbo51 is a compiler for the programming language Pascal, for the Intel MCS-51 (8051) family of microcontrollers. It features Borland Turbo Pascal 7 syntax, support for inline assembly code, source-level debugging, and optimizations, among others. The compiler is written in Object Pascal and produced with Delphi.

In the 1980s, Intel introduced the 8051 as the first member of the MCS-51 processor family. Today, hundreds of cheap derivatives are available from tens of manufacturers. This makes the architecture very interesting for professionals and hobbyists. It is surprising that this 8-bit architecture is still in use today, and is still so popular. Of all 8051 compilers, several widely used C compilers exist, but only a few Pascal compilers. Turbo51 is available as freeware and was created with the goal to make a Pascal compiler for MCS-51 processors that will be as fast as Turbo Pascal, will use the same syntax and will generate high quality optimized code.

== Language dialect ==
Turbo51 uses Borland Turbo Pascal 7 dialect. The syntax was extended with some constructs to support specific features of MCS-51 processors.

Var   RS485_TX: Boolean absolute P3.2;
      I2C.SDA:   Boolean absolute P3.7;
      I2C.SCL:   Boolean absolute P3.4;

      EEPROM_Data:    TEEPROM_Data XDATA absolute 0;

      ModuleAddress:  Byte;
      RX_LedTimer:    Byte;
      TX_LedTimer:    Byte;

      SavedOutput:    TOutputData IDATA;
      OutputsAuxData: Array [1..8] of Byte IDATA;

== Features ==
- Win32 console application
- Fast single pass optimizing compiler
- Borland Turbo Pascal 7 syntax
- Full floating point support
- Mixed Pascal and assembly programming
- Full use of register banks
- Advanced multi-pass optimizer
- Smart linker
- Generates compact high quality code
- Output formats: Binary, Intel HEX, OMF51 Object Module Format
- Assembly source code generation

== "Hello World" example ==
Program HelloWorld;

Const
 Osc      = 22118400;
 BaudRate = 19200;

 BaudRateTimerValue = Byte (- Osc div 12 div 32 div BaudRate);

Var SerialPort: Text;

Procedure WriteToSerialPort; Assembler;
Asm
  CLR   TI
  MOV   SBUF, A
@WaitLoop:
  JNB   TI, @WaitLoop
end;

Procedure Init;
begin
  TL1  := BaudRateTimerValue;
  TH1  := BaudRateTimerValue;
  TMOD := %00100001;    { Timer1: no GATE, 8 bit timer, autoreload }
  SCON := %01010000;    { Serial Mode 1, Enable Reception }
  TI   := True;         { Indicate TX ready }
  TR1  := True;         { Enable timer 1 }

  Assign (SerialPort, WriteToSerialPort)
end;

begin
  Init;
  Writeln (SerialPort, 'Hello world!')
end.

== See also ==
- Intel 8051
- Pascal (programming language)
- Comparison of Pascal and C
- Borland
- Turbo Pascal
