= Wellings =

Wellings is a surname. Notable people with the surname include:

- Andy Wellings, English computer scientist
- Barry Wellings (born 1958), English footballer
- Bob Wellings (1934–2022), English television presenter
- Eloise Wellings (born 1982), Australian long-distance runner
- Evelyn Wellings (1909–1992), English cricketer and journalist
- Helen Wellings, Australian consumer advocate and television presenter
- Paul Wellings (born 1953), English ecologist
- Peter Wellings (born 1970), English cricketer
