= Andy Wellings =

Andy J. Wellings is a professor in the Department of Computer Science at the University of York in northern England. He works closely with Alan Burns on real-time systems, distributed, concurrent and real-time programming languages.

Andy Wellings is a member of the team responsible for the creation of the Real-time specification for Java. He is also an Ada programming language expert.

== Books ==
Wellings has written a number of books on programming, especially in Ada.

- Alan Burns, Andy Wellings (5 April 2001). Real-Time Systems and Programming Languages. Ada 95, Real-Time Java and Real-Time POSIX (3rd ed.). Addison-Wesley. ISBN 0-201-72988-1.
- Alan Burns, Andy Wellings (November 1998). Concurrency in Ada (2nd ed.). Cambridge University Press. ISBN 0-521-62911-X.
- Andy Wellings (September 2004). Concurrent and Real-Time Programming in Java. John Wiley & Sons. ISBN 0-470-84437-X.
