= Alan Burns (computer scientist) =

British computer scientist

Alan Burns FREng FIET FBCS CEng FIEEE

Professor of Computer Science, University of York

Alan Burns is a professor in the Department of Computer Science at the University of York, England. He has been at York since 1990, and held the post of Head of department from 1999 until 30 June 2006, when he was succeeded by John McDermid.

He is a member of the department's Real-Time Systems Research Group, and has authored or co-authored over 300 publications, with a large proportion of them concentrating on real-time systems and the Ada programming language. Burns has been actively involved in the creation of the Ravenscar profile, a subset of Ada's tasking model, designed to enable the analysis of real-time programs for their timing properties.

In 2006, Alan Burns was awarded the Annual Technical Achievement Award for technical achievement and leadership by the IEEE Technical Committee on Real-time Systems. In 2009, he was elected Fellow of the Royal Academy of Engineering. He is also a Fellow of the British Computer Society (BCS) and the Institution of Engineering and Technology (IET), and a Fellow of the Institute of Electrical and Electronics Engineers (IEEE).

== Books ==
Alan Burns has written a number of computer science books.

- Alan Burns, Andy Wellings (5 April 2001). Real-Time Systems and Programming Languages. Ada 95, Real-Time Java and Real-Time POSIX (3rd ed.). Addison-Wesley. ISBN 0-201-72988-1.
- Alan Burns, Andy Wellings (November 1998). Concurrency in Ada (2nd ed.). Cambridge University Press. ISBN 0-521-62911-X.
