= Department of Computer Science, University of York =

Department of the University of York, England

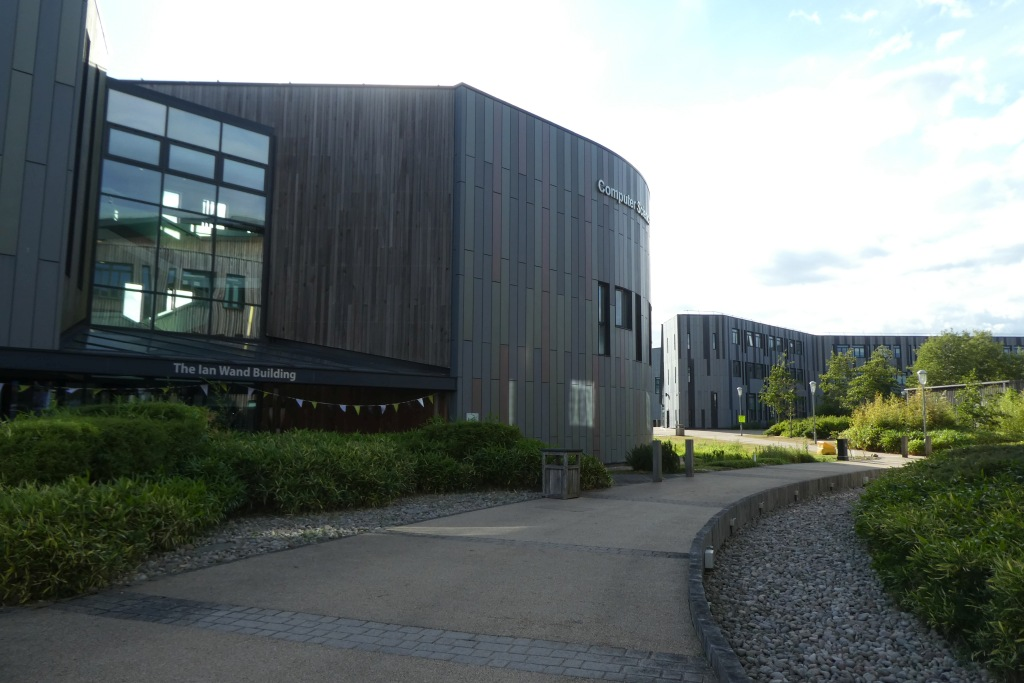
- Type: Academic department
- Established: 1973
- Parent institution: University of York
- Head of Department: Professor Iain Bate
- Academic staff: 117
- Total staff: 151
- Undergraduates: 850
- Postgraduates: 230
- Location: York, Yorkshire
- Website: www.york.ac.uk/computer-science/

The Department of Computer Science at the University of York, England, was founded in 1973, although it has roots back to 1967. It provides undergraduate and postgraduate courses, and currently has 1,080 students.

== History ==
In 1966 the Flowers Report was published. This report recommended the installation of a computer system at most British universities. In response, the University of York established the Computer Steering Committee (CSC) to plan and oversee the construction of the buildings and appointments for the new department. The buildings were completed in the same year. In 1967 the Department of Computation was established. In accordance with the report's vision of computers uses, it had two responsibilities: to operate a computing service and to educate members of the university in how to use the service.

Members of the department quickly began to work beyond this scope. The academic side of computer computer science, research and teaching had never been banned by the report or committee, so the initiative was taken. This drew a backlash in 1972 with a formal complaint to the committee that these 'academic pretentions' were to the detriment of the departments true purpose of service teaching. The department argued that other universities were also developing specialist computer science programmes. Ultimately the committee allowed the department to continue on this track. This approval galvanised the growing split within the department between the academic and service parts.

Ian Pyle was appointed founding professor in 1973, and quickly had 'computation' changed to the more suitable 'computer science'. Consequently, the department was renamed Department of Computer Science. This move towards computer science as academic continued to isolate the service half of the department. In 1974 the differences were formalised in two separate sections, Computer Science, and Computer Service, with individuals no longer holding responsibly in both halves. Around 1975, the University Council established the Computer Service as separate from the department, and consequently renamed the oversight committee to the Computer Service Advisory Committee.

In 1975, during an extension to the department buildings, three lecturers were relocated to the Physics Department. The room there allowed them to create the department's first proper research laboratory, which they were able to transfer to the department's complex once the extension was complete.

1979 saw the first intake to a single subject taught by the department, Bachelor of Science in Computer Science.

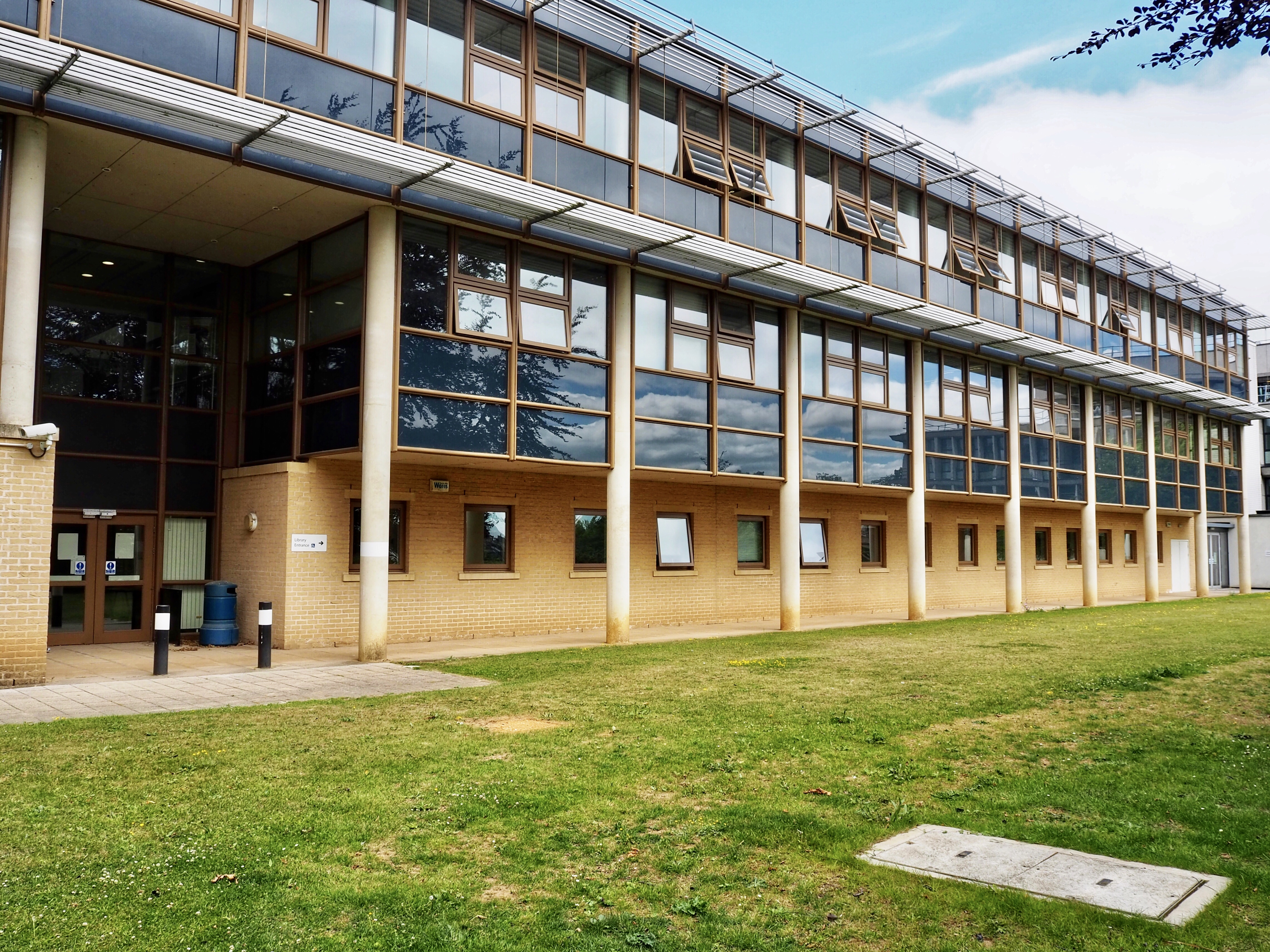
The Computer Science Building, later the Harry Fairhurst Library

By late 1990s the department was spread over nine locations. For the first time since the department was founded, they were brought together in a new building next to the Library. In 2010 the department moved again, this time to a purpose-built building on Heslington East. The Computer Science Building was absorbed into the Library, becoming the Harry Fairhurst Library.

The Computer Science building on Heslington East was officially opened in 2011.

In 2012 the department received the Bronze award from the Athena SWAN Charter for good practise in promoting women in science and technology.

In June 2022 the department celebrated its fiftieth anniversary. As part of the celebration, the Computer Science Building was renamed the Ian Wand building.

== Courses ==
The department offers Bachelor of Science and Master of Engineering degrees in Computer Science. Both of these degrees can have specialised courses in Artificial Intelligence or Cyber Security. A combined course with Mathematics is also available for a Bachelor of Science or Master of Mathematics. A separate Data Science course is also provided, working towards a Bachelor of Science or Master of Science degree. All of these courses can include a year in industry.

Postgraduate courses are Master of Science, either by research or taught, and a Doctor of Philosophy.

== Research ==
The department has nine research groups: Artificial Intelligence, Automated Software Engineering, Cyber Security and Privacy, High Integrity Systems, Human Computer Interaction, Quantum Information, Real-Time and Distributed Systems, Software Engineering for Robotics, and Vision, Graphics and Learning.

== Organisation ==
=== Heads of Department ===
1973–1983 – Professor Ian Pyle

1983–1992 – Professor Ian Wand

1992–1999 – Dr Keith Mander

1999–2003 – Professor Alan Burns

2003–2004 – Professor Michael Harrison

2004–2006 – Professor Alan Burns

2006–2012 – Professor John McDermid

2012–2016 – Professor Jim Woodcock

2016 – Professor John Clark

2016–2017 – Professor John McDermid

2017–2021 – Professor Neil Audsley

2021–2024 – Professor Paul Cairns

2024-Present - Professor Iain Bate
