= John A. McDermid =

John A McDermid
- Born: United Kingdom
- Education: Cambridge University; University of Birmingham
- Known for: Software engineering
- Awards: BCS Fellow; FREng (2002); OBE (2010)
- Scientific career
- Fields: Software engineering
- Workplaces: University of York, UK

John A. McDermid OBE FREng is a computer scientist and professor at the University of York, UK, and chairman of Rapita Systems Ltd. UK.

== Education ==
McDermid received his undergraduate education at Cambridge University and later his Ph.D. at the University of Birmingham, UK in 1981.

== Career ==
McDermid was with the UK Ministry of Defence as a research scientist and spent five years in the software industry. He then moved to take up the position of chair in software engineering at the University of York since 1987. He became head of Department of Computer Science for the years 2006-2012 and 2016-2017. He is author or editor of six books and has published over 370 papers. He was a vice president of BCS, The Chartered Institute for IT from 2000 to 2003 and a founding member of the United Kingdom Computing Research Committee. He is a member of the Defence Scientific Advisory Council and the Rolls-Royce Electrical and Controls Advisory Board. He became chairman of Rapita Systems in January 2014.

== Awards ==
He was made an Officer of the Most Excellent Order of the British Empire and elected to Fellow of the Royal Academy of Engineering. He is a fellow of the BCS.
