= List of widget toolkits =

This article provides a list of widget toolkits (also known as GUI frameworks), used to construct the graphical user interface (GUI) of programs, organized by their relationships with various operating systems.

== Low-level widget toolkits ==
=== Integrated in the operating system ===
- Mac OS X uses Cocoa. Mac OS 9 and Mac OS X used to use Carbon for 32-bit applications.
- The Windows API used in Microsoft Windows. Microsoft had the graphics functions integrated in the kernel until 2006
- The Haiku operating system uses an extended and modernised version of the Be API that was used by its predecessor BeOS. Haiku is expected to drop binary and source compatibility with BeOS at some future time, which will result in a Haiku API.

=== As a separate layer on top of the operating system ===
- The X Window System contains primitive building blocks, called Xt or "Intrinsics", but they are mostly only used by older toolkits such as: OLIT, Motif and Xaw. Most contemporary toolkits, such as GTK or Qt, bypass them and use Xlib or XCB directly.
- The Amiga OS Intuition was formerly present in the Amiga Kickstart ROM and integrated itself with a medium-high level widget library which invoked the Workbench Amiga native GUI. Since Amiga OS 2.0, Intuition.library became disk based and object oriented. Also Workbench.library and Icon.library became disk based, and could be replaced with similar third-party solutions.
- Since 2005, Microsoft has taken the graphics system out of Windows' kernel.

== High-level widget toolkits ==
Widget toolkit comparison table
| Toolkit name | Windows | macOS | Unix-like | Android | iOS | Programming language | License |
|---|---|---|---|---|---|---|---|
| AWT | cross-platform | | | | | Java | |
| Compose Multiplatform | Yes | Yes | Yes | | Yes | Kotlin | Apache |
| Jetpack Compose | | | | Yes | | Kotlin | Apache |
| CEGUI | Yes | Yes | Yes | | | C++ | MIT |
| Cocoa | No | Yes | No | | | Objective-C | Proprietary |
| Elementary | Yes | Yes | Yes | | | C | LGPL, BSD |
| FLTK | Yes | Yes | Yes | | | C++ | LGPL |
| Fox toolkit | Yes | No | Yes | | | C++ | LGPL |
| Fyne | cross-platform | | | | | Go | BSD |
| GNUstep | Yes | Yes | Yes | | | Objective-C | LGPL |
| GTK | Yes | Yes | Yes | | | C | LGPL |
| Kivy | cross-platform | | | | | Python | MIT |
| LCL | Yes | Yes | Yes | | | Object Pascal (Free Pascal) | LGPL |
| IUP | Yes | No | Yes | | | C | MIT |
| Juce | cross-platform | | | | | C++ | GPL, proprietary |
| LessTif | No | No | Yes | | | C | LGPL |
| Motif | No | No | Yes | | | C | LGPL |
| MFC | Yes | No | No | | | C++ | Proprietary |
| OWL (superseded by VCL) | Yes | No | No | | | C++ (Borland C++) | Proprietary |
| Pivot (WTK) | cross-platform | | | | | Java | Apache License |
| Qt | cross-platform | | | | | C++ | LGPL, proprietary |
| Rogue Wave Views | Yes | No | Yes | | | C++ | proprietary |
| Shoes (GUI toolkit) | cross-platform | | | | | Ruby | MIT |
| Swing | cross-platform | | | | | Java | |
| SwiftUI | | Yes | | | Yes | Swift | Proprietary |
| Tk | Yes | Yes | Yes | | | Tcl | BSD |
| TnFOX | Yes | Yes | Yes | | | C++ | LGPL |
| U++ | cross-platform | | | | | C++ | BSD |
| VCL (supersedes OWL) | Yes | No | No | | | Object Pascal (Delphi) | Proprietary |
| WTL | Yes | No | No | | | C++ | Microsoft Public License |
| wxWidgets | cross-platform | | | | | C++ | WxWindows license |

=== OS dependent ===
==== On Amiga ====
- BOOPSI (Basic Object Oriented Programming System for Intuition) was introduced with OS 2.0 and enhanced Intuition with a system of classes in which every class represents a single widget or describes an interface event. This led to an evolution in which third-party developers each realised their own personal systems of classes.
- MUI: object-oriented GUI toolkit and the official toolkit for MorphOS.
- ReAction: object-oriented GUI toolkit and the official toolkit for AmigaOS.
- Zune (GUI toolkit) is an open source clone of MUI and the official toolkit for AROS.

==== On macOS ====
- Cocoa - used in macOS (see also Aqua). As a result of macOS' OPENSTEP lineage, Cocoa also supports Windows, although it is not publicly advertised as such. It is generally unavailable for use by third-party developers. An outdated and feature-limited open-source subset of Cocoa exists within the WebKit project, however; it is used to render Aqua natively in Safari (web browser) for Windows. Apple's iTunes, which supports both GDI and WPF, includes a mostly complete binary version of the framework as "Apple Application Support".
- Carbon - the deprecated framework used in Mac OS X to port “classic” Mac applications and software to the Mac OS X.
- MacApp, the framework for the Classic Mac OS by Apple.
- PowerPlant, the framework for the Classic Mac OS by Metrowerks.

==== On Microsoft Windows ====
- The Microsoft Foundation Classes (MFC), a C++ wrapper around the Windows API.
- The Windows Template Library (WTL), a template-based extension to ATL and a replacement of MFC
- The Object Windows Library (OWL), Borland's alternative to MFC.
- The Visual Component Library (VCL) is Embarcadero's toolkit used in C++Builder and Delphi. It wraps the native Windows controls, providing object-oriented classes and visual design, although also allowing access to the underlying handles and other WinAPI details if required. It was originally implemented as a successor to OWL, skipping the OWL/MFC style of UI creation, which by the mid-nineties was a dated design model.
- Windows Forms (WinForms) is Microsoft's .NET set of classes that handle GUI controls. In the cross-platform Mono implementation, it is an independent toolkit, implemented entirely in managed code (not wrapping the Windows API, which doesn't exist on other platforms). WinForms' design closely mimics that of the VCL.
- The Windows Presentation Foundation (WPF) is the graphical subsystem of the .NET Framework 3.0. User interfaces can be created in WPF using any of the CLR languages (e.g. C#) or with the XML-based language XAML. Microsoft Expression Blend is a visual GUI builder for WPF.
- The Windows UI Library (WinUI) is the graphical subsystem of universal apps. User interfaces can be created in WinUI using C++ or any of the .NET languages (e.g., C#) or with the XML-based language XAML. Microsoft Expression Blend is a visual GUI builder that supports WinUI.

==== On Unix, under the X Window System ====
Note that the X Window System was originally primarily for Unix-like operating systems, but it now runs on Microsoft Windows as well using, for example, Cygwin, so some or all of these toolkits can also be used under Windows.

- Motif used in the Common Desktop Environment.
- LessTif, an open source (LGPL) implementation of Motif.
- MoOLIT, a bridge between the look-and-feel of OPEN LOOK and Motif
- OLIT, an Xt-based OPEN LOOK intrinsics toolkit
- Xaw, the Project Athena widget set for the X Window System.
- XView, a SunView compatible OPEN LOOK toolkit

=== Cross-platform ===
==== Based on C (including bindings to other languages) ====
- Elementary, open source (LGPL), a part of the Enlightenment Foundation Libraries.
- GTK, open source (LGPL), primarily for the X Window System, ported to and emulated under other platforms; used in the GNOME, Rox, LXDE and Xfce desktop environments. The Windows port has support for native widgets.
- IUP, open source (MIT), a minimalist GUI toolkit in ANSI C for Windows, UNIX and Linux.
- Tk, open source (BSD-style), a widget set accessed from Tcl and other high-level script languages (interfaced in Python as Tkinter).
- XForms, the Forms Library for X
- XVT, Extensible Virtual Toolkit

==== Based on C++ (including bindings to other languages) ====
- CEGUI, open source (MIT License), cross-platform widget toolkit designed for game development, but also usable for applications and tool development. Supports multiple renderers and optional libraries.
- FLTK, open source (LGPL), cross-platform toolkit designed to be small and fast.
- FOX toolkit, open source (LGPL), cross-platform toolkit.
- GLUI, a very small toolkit written with the GLUT library.
- gtkmm, C++ interface for GTK
- Juce provides GUI and widget set with the same look and feel in Microsoft Windows, X Windows Systems, macOS and Android. Rendering can be based on OpenGL.
- Qt, open source (GPL, LGPL) with optional proprietary/commercial licensing, available under Unix and Linux (with X11 or Wayland), Windows (Desktop, CE and Phone 8), macOS, iOS, Android, BlackBerry 10 and embedded Linux; used in the KDE, Trinity, LXQt, and Lumina desktop environment, it's also used in Ubuntu's Unity shell.
- Rogue Wave Views (formerly ILOG Views) provides GUI and graphic library for Windows and the main X11 platforms.
- TnFOX, open source (LGPL), a portability toolkit.
- U++ is an Open-source application framework bundled with an IDE (BSD license), mainly created for Win32 and Unix-like operating system (X11) but now works with almost any operating systems.
- wxWidgets (formerly wxWindows), open source (relaxed LGPL), abstract toolkits across several platforms for C++, Python, Perl, Ruby and Haskell.
- Zinc Application Framework, cross-platform widget toolkit.

==== Based on Python ====
- Tkinter, open source (BSD) is a Python binding to the Tk GUI toolkit. Tkinter is included with standard Linux, Microsoft Windows and macOS installs of Python.
- Kivy, open source (MIT) is a modern library for rapid development of applications that make use of innovative user interfaces, such as multi-touch apps. Fully written in Python with additional speed ups in Cython.
- PySide, open source (LGPL) is a Python binding of the cross-platform GUI toolkit Qt developed by The Qt Company, as part of the Qt for Python project.
- PyQt, open source (GPL and commercial) is another Python binding of the cross-platform GUI toolkit Qt developed by Riverbank Computing.
- PyGTK, open source (LGPL) is a set of Python wrappers for the GTK graphical user interface library.
- wxPython, open source (wxWindows License) is a wrapper for the cross-platform GUI API wxWidgets for the Python programming language.

==== Based on Flash ====
- Adobe Flash allows creating widgets running in most web browsers and in several mobile phones.
- Adobe Flex provides high-level widgets for building web user interfaces. Flash widgets can be used in Flex.
- Flash and Flex widgets will run without a web browser in the Adobe AIR runtime environment.
- Adobe AIR allow the creation of rich Internet applications based upon Flash

==== Based on Go ====
- Fyne, open source (BSD) is inspired by the principles of Material Design to create applications that look and behave consistently across Windows, macOS, Linux, BSD, Android and iOS.

==== Based on XML ====
- GladeXML with GTK
- XAML with Silverlight or Moonlight
- XUL

==== Based on JavaScript ====
General

- jQuery UI
- MooTools
- Qooxdoo Could be understood as Qt for the Web
- Script.aculo.us

RIAs

- Dojo
- Ext JS (formerly Sencha Touch)
- Telerik Kendo UI
- Webix
- WinJS
- React Native

Full-stack framework

- Echo3
- SproutCore
- Telerik UI for ASP/PHP/JSP/Silverlight
- Vaadin - Java

Resource-based

- Google Web Toolkit (GWT)
- FBML Facebook Markup Language

No longer developed

- YUI (Yahoo! User Interface Library)

==== Based on SVG ====
- Raphaël is a JavaScript toolkit for SVG interfaces and animations

==== Based on C# ====
- Windows Forms. There is an original Microsoft's implementation that is a wrapper around the Windows API and runs on Windows, and Mono's alternative implementation that is cross platform.

==== Based on Java ====
- The Abstract Window Toolkit (AWT) is Sun Microsystems' original widget toolkit for Java applications. It typically uses another toolkit on each platform on which it runs.
- Swing is a richer widget toolkit supported since J2SE 1.2 as a replacement for AWT widgets. Swing is a lightweight toolkit, meaning it does not rely on native widgets.
- Apache Pivot is an open-source platform for building rich web applications in Java or any JVM-compatible language, and relies on the WTK widget toolkit.
- JavaFX and FXML.
- The Standard Widget Toolkit (SWT) is a native widget toolkit for Java that was developed as part of the Eclipse project. SWT uses a standard toolkit for the running platform (such as the Windows API, macOS Cocoa, or GTK) underneath.
- Codename One originally designed as a cross platform mobile toolkit it later expanded to support desktop applications both through JavaSE and via a JavaScript pipeline through browsers
- Qt Jambi, the official Java binding to Qt from Trolltech. The commercial support and development has stopped
- ZK - A Java Web framework for building rich Ajax and mobile applications

==== Based on Object Pascal ====
- FireMonkey or FMX is a cross-platform widget and graphics library distributed with Delphi and C++Builder since version XE2 in 2011. It has bindings for C++ through C++Builder, and supports Windows, macOS, iOS, Android, and most recently Linux. FireMonkey supports platform-native widgets, such as a native edit control, and custom widgets that are styled to look native on a target operating system. Its graphics are GPU-accelerated and it supports styling, and mixing its own implementation controls with native system controls, which lets apps use native behaviour where it's important (for example, for IME text input.)
- IP Pascal uses a graphics library built on top of standard language constructs. Also unusual for being a procedural toolkit that is cross-platform (no callbacks or other tricks), and is completely upward compatible with standard serial input and output paradigms. Completely standard programs with serial output can be run and extended with graphical constructs.
- Lazarus LCL (for Pascal, Object Pascal and Delphi via Free Pascal compiler), a class library wrapping GTK+ 1.2–2.x, and the Windows API (Carbon, Windows CE and Qt4 support are all in development).
- CLX (Component Library for Cross-platform) was used with Borland's (now Embarcadero's) Delphi, C++ Builder, and Kylix, for producing cross-platform applications between Windows and Linux. It was based on Qt, wrapped in such a way that its programming interface was similar to that of the VCL toolkit. It is no longer maintained and distributed, and has been replaced with FireMonkey, a newer toolkit also supporting more platforms, since 2011.

==== Based on Objective-C ====
- GNUstep and OpenStep
- Cocoa and Cocoa Touch

==== Based on Dart ====
- Flutter (software) is an open-source and cross platform framework created by Google.

==== Based on Swift ====
- Cocoa Touch is a framework created by Apple to build applications for iOS, iPadOS and tvOS.

==== Based on Ruby ====
- Shoes (GUI toolkit) is a cross platform framework for graphical user interface development.

== Not yet categorised ==
- WINGs
- LiveCode
- Wt
- Immediate Mode GUI

== Comparison of widget toolkits ==
| Toolkit | Initial release | Latest release | Main language | Bindings | Tools | License | Pros | Cons | Back-end |
|---|---|---|---|---|---|---|---|---|---|
| ATL, WTL | 2004 | | C++ | | Visual Studio | | | not portable | |
| AWT | 1995 | | Java | | | | portable | | |
| CEGUI | 2004 | 0.8.7 | C++ | Python, Lua (using tolua++) | CEED | MIT License | Free license, fast, cross-platform, portable, free GUI editing tool | | |
| CLX | | | C++ | | | | | | |
| Elementary | 2007 (EFL: 2001) | 2016 | C | JavaScript, Python, Vala, C++ | editje, edje | LGPL | Portable, stable, fast, finger-friendly | | |
| FLTK | 1998 | 2019 | C++ | Python (pyFLTK), Perl (FLTK.pm), Ruby (Ruby/FLTK), Tcl (Tcl Fltk), Guile (guile-fltk), Eiffel (IFLTK), C (cfltk), Rust (FLTK-rs) | FLUID (Fast Light UI Designer) | LGPL (with an exception that allows static linking) | fast, small enough to static link | limited widget selection | |
| Flutter | 2017 | | Dart | | | BSD | Portable, cross platform, free license, rich widget set | | |
| FOX | 1997 | | C++ | Ruby (FXRuby), Python (FXPy), Eiffel (EiffelFox) | | | consistent across platforms | non-native look and feel | |
| Fyne | 2018 | 2020 (1.3.2) | Go | | | BSD | consistent across platforms, no runtime dependency | requires OpenGL | |
| GLUI | | | C++ | | | | | | |
| GNUstep | 1994 | 2017 | Objective-C | Java, Ruby, Scheme | Gorm (computing) | GPL for the apps, LGPL for the libs | Portable, free license | Native on macOS (with Cocoa) | X11, Win32, Wayland |
| GTK | 1997 | 4.24.1 | C | C++ (gtkmm), Perl (Gtk2-perl), Ruby (ruby-gtk2), Python (PyGTK), Haskell (Gtk2Hs), Java (java-gnome) (not available for Microsoft Windows), C# (Gtk#), PHP (PHP-GTK), Ada (GTKAda), D (gtkD), FreeBasic (GladeToBac), Go (go-gtk), OCaml (lablgtk), JavaScript (Gjs, Seed (programming)), Fortran (gtk-fortran), Lua (lua-lgi), R (RGtk2) and others via GTK-server | Glade, GNOME Builder | LGPL | Portable, free license | Partly native only. | |
| IUP | 1992 | 2019 | C | Lua (IupLua) | LEDC: a compiler for LED | MIT | Portable, lightweight, use the native API, native look&feel, free licence | Non‑Unicode (only plain ASCII) | |
| Juce | 2004 | | C++ | | Jucer | GPL, commercial | Cross-platform, with additional audio plug-in wrapping tools (VST, RTAS, AAX etc.) | The free version has a splash screen. | |
| MFC, WinAPI | 1992 | | C++ | | Visual Studio | | | not portable (but Wine implements it for X Window) | |
| Motif, Lesstif | 1980s | | C | | BX Pro | | | | |
| Qt | 1995 | 6.12 | C++ | Ruby (QtRuby), Python (PyQt, PySide, PythonQt), Ada (QtAda), c# (Qyoto), Java (Qt Jambi), Pascal (FreePascal Qt4), Perl (Perl Qt4), PHP(PHP-Qt), Haskell (Qt Haskell), Lua (lqt, QtLua), Dao (DaoQt), Tcl (qtcl), Common Lisp (CommonQt), D (QtD), Harbour (hbqt) | Qt Designer, Qt Creator | GPL, LGPL. | Portable, rich widget set, GUI builder, free license, stable API | Partially native only. | |
| Shoes (GUI toolkit) | 2007 | 2010 | Ruby | | | MIT license/Open source | Simplicity, ease of use | | |
| Swing | 1996 | | Java | | Eclipse, NetBeans | GPL for OpenJDK | Portable (Java), advanced widgets, GUI builders | | |
| JavaFX | 2008 | 2022 | Java | | NetBeans, Scene Builder | GPL | | | |
| SWT | | | Java | D (DWT) | Eclipse | | portable | | |
| Tk | 1991 | 2025 | C, Tcl | Ruby (RubyTk), Python (Tkinter), Perl (Perl/Tk), Ada (TASH), Common Lisp (LTk), Erlang (etk), ... | | | BSD | very portable, many language bindings | | |
| U++ | 2004 | 2022 | C++ | | theIDE | BSD | portable, NTL, free license | Underdeveloped on android | |
| VCL | | | Delphi | | | | | | |
| Windows Forms | | | CLI languages | CLI languages | Expression, Visual Studio | | | portability issues, no MVC | |
| WPF, XAML, Silverlight | 2007 | | CLI languages | CLI languages | Expression, Visual Studio | | | Portability issues | |
| wxWidgets | 1992 | 3.3.4 | C++ | C++ (native), Ruby (wxRuby), Python (wxPython), Perl (wxPerl), Java (wxJava, jwx!), Lua (wxLua), Tcl(wxTCL), JavaScript (GLUEscript), Smalltalk (wxSqueak), Erlang (wxErlang), Haskell (wxHaskell), C (wxC), D (wxD), .NET framework (wxNet), Common Lisp (wxCL), Basic (wxBasic), BlitzMax (wxMax), Euphoria (wxEuphoria), Ada (wxAda), Pike (wxPike) | VisualWx, Boa Constructor, PythonCard, Spe, XRCed, wxGlade, wxFormBuilder, DialogBlocks ($), wxDesigner ($) | wxWindows License | Portable, rich widget set, free licence, semantic similarities to MFC make migration easy. | | |
| Xaw, Athena | 1983 | 1.0.13 | C | | | MIT X11 | | | |
| XUL | | | XML, JavaScript | | | | portable | | |
| XVT | 1989 | 2010 | C and C++ | | Design for C and architect for C++ | Proprietary | Cross-platform, rich widget set, C and C++ GUI builders, very stable | | |
| Toolkit | Initial release | Latest release | Main language | Bindings | Tools | License | Pros | Cons | Back-end |

== See also ==
- List of platform-independent GUI libraries
