= List of platform-independent GUI libraries =

This is a list of notable library packages implementing a graphical user interface (GUI) platform-independent GUI library (PIGUI). These can be used to develop software that can be ported to multiple computing platforms with no change to its source code.

== In C, C++ ==
Name	Owner	Platforms	License
Chromium Embedded Framework (CEF)	CEF Project Page	Linux, macOS, Microsoft Windows	Free: BSD
CEGUI	CEGUI team	Linux, macOS, Microsoft Windows	Free: MIT
Enlightenment Foundation Libraries (EFL)	Enlightenment.org	X11, Wayland, Microsoft Windows, macOS, DirectFB, Tizen	Free: BSD
Fast Light Toolkit (FLTK)	Bill Spitzak, et al.	X11, Wayland, Microsoft Windows, macOS	Free: LGPL
GTK formerly GIMP Toolkit	GNOME Foundation	Linux (X11, Wayland), Microsoft Windows, macOS, HTML5	Free: LGPL
IUP	Tecgraf, PUC-Rio	X11, GTK, Microsoft Windows	Free: MIT
JUCE	PACE Anti-Piracy Inc.	X11, Linux, macOS, iOS, Android, Microsoft Windows	Free: AGPL
LiveCode	LiveCode, Ltd.	X11, macOS, Microsoft Windows	Proprietary
Qt	Qt Project	Linux (X11, Wayland), OS/2, macOS, iOS, Android, Microsoft Windows, WebAssembly (partial)	Free: LGPL
U++	U++ team	Linux (X11, GTK), macOS, Microsoft Windows	Free: BSD
wxWidgets formerly wxWindows	wxWidgets team	X11, Wayland, OpenLook, macOS, iOS (partial), Microsoft Windows, OS/2	Free: wxWindows

== In other languages ==
Name	Owner	Programming language	Platforms	License
Apache Flex; Formerly Adobe Flex	Apache Software Foundation	ActionScript, Flash, Adobe AIR	Windows (x86, x64), macOS, Android (ARM, x86), iOS, Web (SWF)	Free: Apache
Avalonia	AvaloniaUI OÜ	C#, XAML, WASM	Windows, macOS, Linux, iOS, Android, Web (WebAssembly), Samsung Tizen	Free: MIT
Delphi, FireMonkey	Embarcadero Technologies	Object Pascal, Python	Windows, macOS, Linux, iOS, Android	Proprietary
Flutter	Google	C, C++, Dart	Windows, macOS, Linux, iOS, Android, Web	Free: New BSD License
Fyne	Open source	Go	Windows, macOS, Linux, BSD, Android, iOS (experimental: Web)	Free: New BSD License
Godot (game engine)	Open source	GDScript, C++, C#, GDNative	Linux, macOS, Windows, BSD, Haiku, iOS, Android, HTML5, WebAssembly, Xbox One, Universal Windows Platform, also useful for making GUI apps in VR (OpenXR and WebXR)	Free: MIT
PureBasic	Fantaisie Software	BASIC	Windows, Linux and OSX	Proprietary
JavaFX	Oracle Corporation	Java	Windows, Linux X11, macOS, Android, iOS	Free: CDDL, GPL with linking exception
Kivy	Kivy	Python	Linux, Windows, macOS, Android, iOS	Free: MIT
LCL, Lazarus	Open source	Free Pascal	Windows (Win32, Qt), Linux (GTK, Qt), macOS (Qt, Carbon, Cocoa)	Free: GPL, LGPL
Mono, GTK#	Xamarin	C#	Windows, Linux (X11, Wayland), macOS	Free: MIT, LGPLv2, GPLv2 (dual license)
Swing	Oracle Corporation	Java	Windows, Linux X11, macOS	Free: CDDL, GPL with linking exception
SWT	Eclipse Foundation	Java	Windows (Win32), Linux (GTK), macOS (Cocoa)	Free: Eclipse
Tcl/Tk	Open source	Tcl	Windows, OS/2, X11, OpenLook, Mac, Android	Free: BSD-style
Unity	Unity Technologies	C#, JavaScript, Boo	Windows, X11, macOS, Android, iOS also features cross-platform Web player	Proprietary, based on open-source
Uno Platform	nventive	C#, XAML, WASM	Windows, iOS, Android, Web (WebAssembly), experimental macOS	Free: Apache
VisualWorks	Cincom	Smalltalk	Windows, OS/2, Linux (X11), OpenLook, Mac	Proprietary
Xojo	Xojo, Inc.	Xojo	Windows, macOS, Linux (X11), iOS, web	Proprietary
LispWorks CAPI	LispWorks, Ltd.	Common Lisp	Windows, macOS, Linux (Gtk+), Motif	Proprietary

== No longer available or supported ==
Name	Owner	Comment
Apache Pivot	Apache Software Foundation	Originally for Java, it was retired in January 2025 and was moved into the Apache Attic in April 2025
VisualAge	IBM	Discontinued by IBM in 2007.
AppWare	Novell	Has been de-emphasized (commonly viewed as dropped) by Novell
Open Interface	Neuron Data	One of the earliest PIGUI supported DOS, macOS, OS/2, VMS, Microsoft Windows 3.0
Zinc Application Framework	Professional Software Associates	May still be supported, but no new sales

== See also ==
- List of widget toolkits
- List of rich web application frameworks
