= WxFormBuilder =

Open source GUI design application

wxFormBuilder
- Original authors: José Antonio Hurtado Juan Antonio Ortega; Ryan Mulder; Ryan Pusztai; Michal Bliznak Jan Niklas Hasse
- Developers: Steffen Olszewski wxFormBuilder Contributors
- Initial release: 2006; 20 years ago
- Stable release: 4.2.1 / 29 May 2024; 23 months ago
- Written in: C++
- Operating system: Cross-platform
- Platform: Windows, MacOS, Linux
- Available in: English
- Type: GUI builder; Linux on the desktop; Human interface guidelines
- License: GPLv2
- Website: wxformbuilder.org
- Repository: github.com/wxFormBuilder/wxFormBuilder

wxFormBuilder is an open source GUI designer application for wxWidgets toolkit, which allows creating cross-platform applications. A streamlined, easy to use interface enables faster development and easier maintenance of software. It is written in C++.

wxFormBuilder is a visual development tool, but also allows including non-graphical components. It can generate C++, Python, PHP, Lua and XRC code. The generated code cannot be edited directly in the program.

== Event handlers ==
wxFormBuilder uses the Connect() method or the event table for creating events. For most of the available controls, custom event handlers can be created. Events can also be added through external XML files, eliminating the need to rebuild.

== Available controls ==
wxFormBuilder have a rich set of supported widgets. They can be easily extended via plugins.

Common	Additional	Containers	Menu-toolbar	Layout	Forms	Contrib (using wxAdditions Plugin)
wxButton; wxBitmapButton; wxStaticText; wxTextCtrl; wxStaticBitmap; wxComboBox; wxChoice; wxListBox; wxListCtrl; wxCheckBox; wxRadioBox; wxRadioButton; wxStaticLine; wxSlider; wxGauge	wxTreeCtrl; wxHtmlWindow; wxRichTextCtrl; wxCheckListBox; wxGrid; wxToggleButton; wxColourPickerCtrl; wxFontPickerCtrl; wxFilePickerCtrl; wxDirPickerCtrl; wxDatePickerCtrl; wxCalendarCtrl; wxScrollBar; wxSpinCtrl; wxSpinButton; wxHyperlinkCtrl; wxGenericDirCtr; CustomControl	wxSplitterWindow; wxScrolledWindow; wxNotebook; wxAuiNotebook; wxListBook; wxChoiceBook	wxStatusBar; wxMenuBar; wxMenu; wxMenuItem; Sub Menus; Menu Separators; wxToolBar; ToolBar Tools; ToolBar Separators	wxBoxSizer; wxStaticBoxSizer; wxGridSizer; wxFlexGridSizer; wxGridBagSizer; wxStdDialogButtonSizer; spacer	wxFrame; wxPanel; wxDialog	wxPlotCtrl; wxPropertyGrid; wxPropertyGridManager; wxFlatNotebook; wxScintilla; awxLed; wxTreeListCtrl; wxLedBarGraph

== See also ==
- wxWidgets
- wxDev-C++
- WxGlade
