= Wish (Unix shell) =

- Original author: Mary Gray
- Developers: Tcl Core Team and Maintainers
- Initial release: May 20, 1988; 37 years ago
- Stable release: 8.6.10 / November 21, 2019; 6 years ago
- Operating system: Cross-platform
- Type: Unix shell
- License: BSD License
- Website: sourceforge.net/projects/tcl/files/Tcl/

wish (Windowing Shell) is a Tcl interpreter extended with Tk commands, available for Unix-like operating systems supporting the X Window System, as well as macOS, Microsoft Windows, and Android. It provides developers the ability to create GUI widgets using the Tk toolkit and the Tcl programming language.

wish is open-source under the BSD License, and is currently part of the Tcl/Tk programming suite.

== Usage ==
wish can be run without parameters. Then the % prompt is displayed and the interpreter awaits for commands entered interactively by the user. An empty window is opened in which the widgets created by user commands are displayed. This mode is suitable for experimenting.

More often wish is run with a name of a file containing a Tcl/Tk script as a parameter. It is also possible to run directly Tcl/Tk scripts; in Unix using the shebang construction; in Windows by associating the .tcl extension with the wish program.

== See also ==
- Tcl/Tk
