= CEGUI =

Graphical user interface library

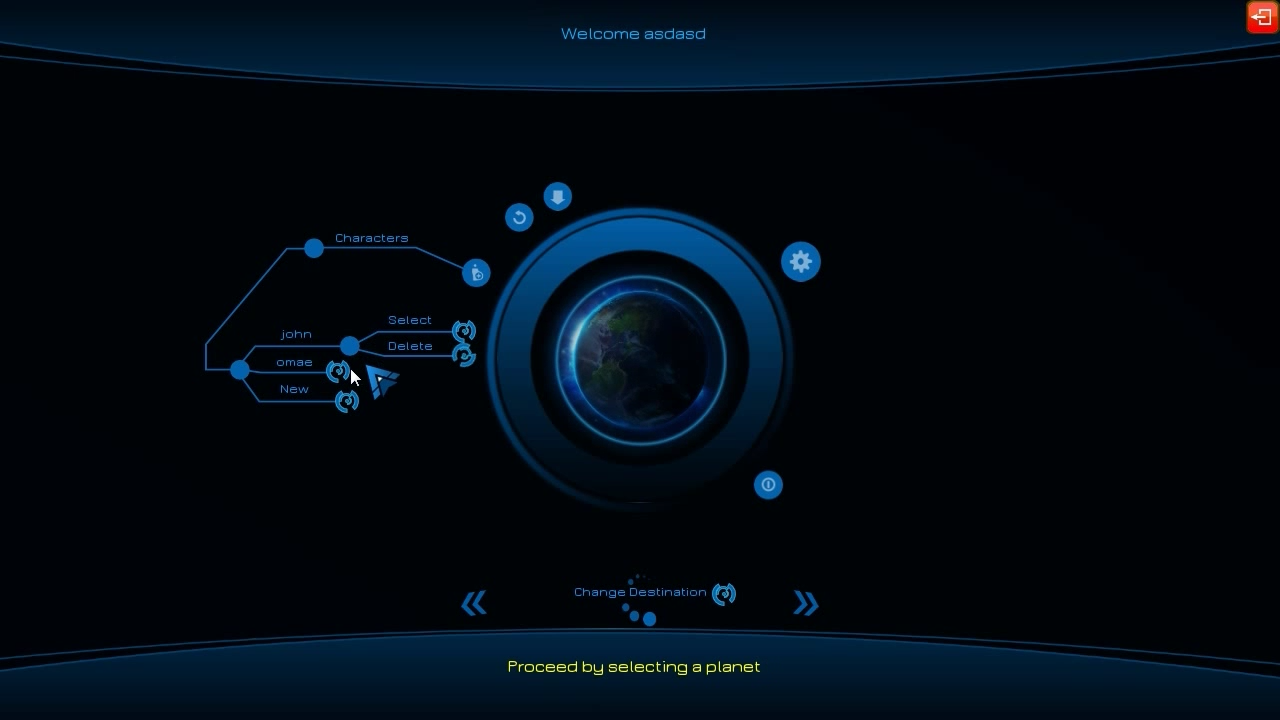
- An example game menu using CEGUI
- Original author: Paul D Turner
- Developer: CEGUI Team
- Release: December 2004; 21 years ago
- Stable release: 0.8.7 / 28 April 2016; 10 years ago
- Written in: C++
- Operating system: Linux, OS X, Windows
- Type: Widget toolkit
- License: MIT; Before version 0.5.0: GNU LGPL
- Website: cegui.org.uk
- Repository: github.com/cegui/cegui

Crazy Eddie's GUI (CEGUI) is a graphical user interface (GUI) library for the programming language C++. It was designed for the needs of video games, but is usable for non-game tasks, such as applications and tools. It is designed for user flexibility in look-and-feel, and to be adaptable to the user's choice in tools and operating systems.

== Configurability ==
The strengths CEGUI are its robustness and its configurability. The system does not directly load files, render windows, directly display text, or even fetch input from the system. CEGUI interfaces with these through user-defined code, though its source code package comes with a number of modules for using certain components and libraries.

This freedom allows using CEGUI in any kind of resource management system or operating environment. Input is expected to be gathered by the user's code, possibly filtered as the user sees fit, and then passed to CEGUI for window processing.

CEGUI comes with a reasonable set of widgets, comparable to those of the average widget toolkit.

== Tools ==
CEGUI can be fully customized using standard image, xml, and/or code editing tools. However, CEGUI also provides tools designed to aid in designing and developing CEGUI based interfaces.

Older CEGUI versions, before 0.8, provided separate tools to edit different aspects of the interface. The most notable of those being the Imageset and Layout editors.

Since CEGUI 0.8, there exists a new unified editing tool called CEGUI unified editor (CEED) which is being actively developed. It incorporates all aspects of GUI development into one tool.

== Rendering ==
Rendering is performed by a back-end Rendering Module. CEGUI provides modules for Direct3D, OpenGL, the OGRE 3D engine, and the Irrlicht Engine. Other modules can be written for custom engines.

CEGUI's GUI components are organized in a tree (graph) and are rendered in the order of the tree traversal.

== Resource management ==
File loading and resource management are handled through a back-end "Resource Provider Module". Users can create custom modules to define how resources are accessed. This allows the library to be used in virtually any operating environment. The default resource provider is cross-platform and provides standard file-access mechanics for loading resources. An optional minizip module enables resource-loading from zip-archives.

== Memory management ==
CEGUI has a flexible Memory Management system. This system was based on OGRE and allows clients to map different types of allocators to different types of objects. By default all objects use the operating system's default allocator. CEGUI provides support for OGRE and nedmalloc allocators.

== Scripting ==
CEGUI has an optional back-end Scripting Module. Lua and Python scripting modules are provided by CEGUI. The full CEGUI application programming interface (API) is available via script so that clients can create windows, define relationships, and handle events all within a scripted environment.

== Look and feel ==
CEGUI has a powerful system for defining the look and feel of various widgets. The system, named Falagard, allows defining the look of a widget via XML files, or C++ code, if the user prefers. It can also change the layout behavior of any widgets.

== Animation ==
CEGUI has a built-in animation system. This system allows many standard transitional effects from moving and resizing windows to color transforms and image sequencing. Animations can be defined in XML and triggered by any event. The client can specify window-properties as key-frames, how to transition between frames, and the transition-time between frames.

== Unicode ==
CEGUI is Unicode-aware and has support for bi-directional languages via an optional back-end Bidi Module. This support is provided by MiniBidi or FriBidi.

== Library dependencies ==
CEGUI can be built with no dependencies to outside libraries. However, typical configurations require FreeType, a rendering module, an XML parser module, and an image codec module. CEGUI already provides support for several external libraries thanks to its modular design:

External libraries supported by CEGUI
Type	Name	Additional information
Rendering Module	OpenGL 3.2+ Core Profile	Uses the programmable rendering pipeline and only non-deprecated functionality and is therefore compatible with OpenGL Core Profile contexts (available since OpenGL 3.2). It can also be used with older OpenGL versions and/or Compatibility Profile, as long as the needed functions are available.
Rendering Module	OpenGL	Uses the fixed-function rendering pipeline. It is designed to be compatible with very early OpenGL versions, as early as OpenGL 1.2, using some OpenGL extensions.
Rendering Module	Microsoft Direct3D	Microsoft Direct3D 9, 10, and 11 are supported using separate modules.
Rendering Module	OGRE	The latest stable Ogre version is supported in the releases.
Rendering Module	Irrlicht Engine	The latest stable Irrlicht version is supported in the releases.
Image Codec Module	Simple Image Loading LibrarY (SILLY)	Default image codec, which is based on the SILLY library. Supports many formats.
Image Codec Module	DevIL	Image codec based on the DevIL library.
Image Codec Module	FreeImage	Image codec based on the FreeImage library.
Image Codec Module	OGRE	Image codec that loads data via image loading facilities of OGRE.
Resource Provider Module	Default	The internal resource provider of CEGUI can be used without requiring an extra module. It uses standard cross-platform file-access.
Resource Provider Module	OGRE	Ogre users can use CEGUI's Ogre ResourceManager. This way the resource locations of CEGUI can be specified in the same way as it is done for the Ogre resources already.
Resource Provider Module	minizip	CEGUI's MinizipResourceProvider allows providing the ability to load resource files from locations within .zip files.
XML Parser Module	Expat	Default XML parser of CEGUI. Uses the Expat library for XML parsing.
XML Parser Module	LibXML2	Uses the LibXML2 library for XML parsing.
XML Parser Module	RapidXml	Uses the RapidXml library for XML parsing.
XML Parser Module	TinyXML	Uses the TinyXML library for XML parsing.
XML Parser Module	Xerces-C++	Uses the Xerces-C++ library for XML parsing. It can validate schemas using the .xsd files provided in CEGUI's resources.
Font Module	FreeType	FreeType is the default font library of CEGUI and currently the only officially supported one.
Regular Expression Module	Perl Compatible Regular Expressions (PCRE)	Default regular expression library and currently the only officially supported one. Uses PCRE.
Scripting Module	Lua	Provides lua bindings using tolua++.
Scripting Module	Python	Official Python bindings are available using PyCEGUI
Memory Management	OGRE	Ogre's memory allocator can optionally be used for CEGUI's memory management.
Memory Management	nedmalloc	nedmalloc can optionally be used as memory allocator.
Bi-Directional Language Module	MiniBIDI	MiniBIDI based implementation of CEGUI's Bidi visual mapping.
Bi-Directional Language Module	FriBIDI	FriBIDI based implementation of CEGUI's Bidi visual mapping.

The Ogre3D library used to depend on the CEGUI library for its UI but Ogre3D has since changed to include its own UI solution, which is slimmer but also provides less functionality.

== Release history ==
Version	Release date
0.1.0	2004-12-19
0.1.1	2005-01-23
0.2.0	2005-02-17
0.2.1	2005-05-30
0.3.0	2005-06-30
0.4.0	2005-09-07
0.4.1	2005-11-26
0.5.0	2006-11-06
0.6.0	2008-03-27
0.6.2	2008-12-03
0.7.0	2009-09-20
0.7.1	2009-10-26
0.7.2	2010-08-29
0.7.3	2010-10-08
0.7.4	2010-10-11
0.7.5	2010-11-20
0.7.6	2012-01-22
0.7.7	2012-06-23
0.7.8	2013-01-08
0.7.9	2013-01-13
0.8.0	2013-05-26
0.8.1	2013-06-05
0.8.2	2013-06-12
0.8.3	2013-12-07
0.8.4	2014-07-07
0.8.5	2016-03-12

== See also ==
- List of widget toolkits
- List of platform-independent GUI libraries
