= Gören Duyan =

Website for missing persons and pets

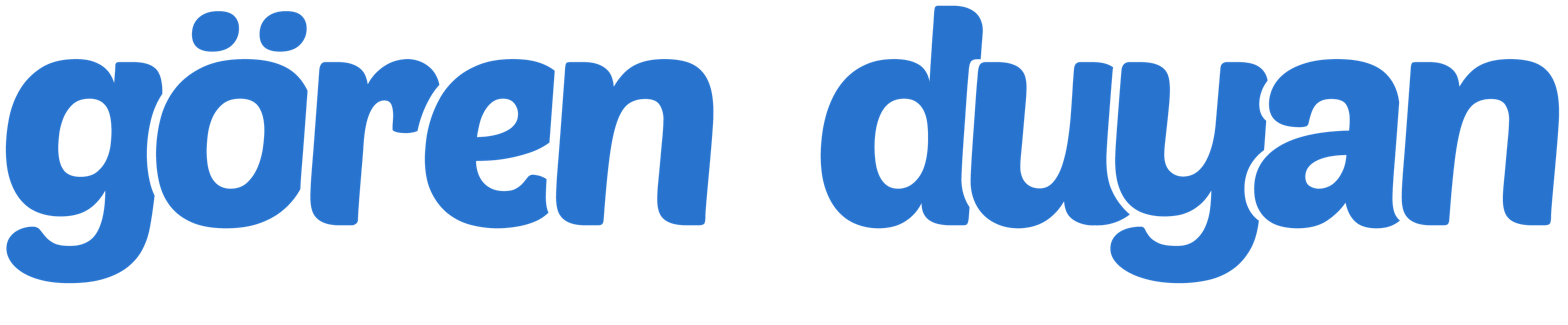

- Website type: Lost classifieds
- Available in: Turkish
- Founded: Turkey
- Founder: Berkay Çatak
- Website: gorenduyan.com
- Commercial: No
- Registration: Optional
- Users: 400.000
- Launched: April 24, 2017 (9 years ago)
- Current status: Active
- Written in: PHP, JavaScript, Flutter

Gören Duyan is a website that allows users to post ads for stolen and lost items, this website founded in 2017.

== History ==
In 2017, this website was established with the aim of collecting the ads of lost and stolen items under a one platform as a result of the increase in the stolen motorcycle ads and the fact that the ads losing their topicality in social media in a short time. Its mobile application was published in 2018. While ensuring the finding of pets lost during the quarantine, it gathered the pets lost in the İzmir earthquake under a single platform to be found in a shorter time.
