= GrandOrgue =

Open-source pipe organ simulator

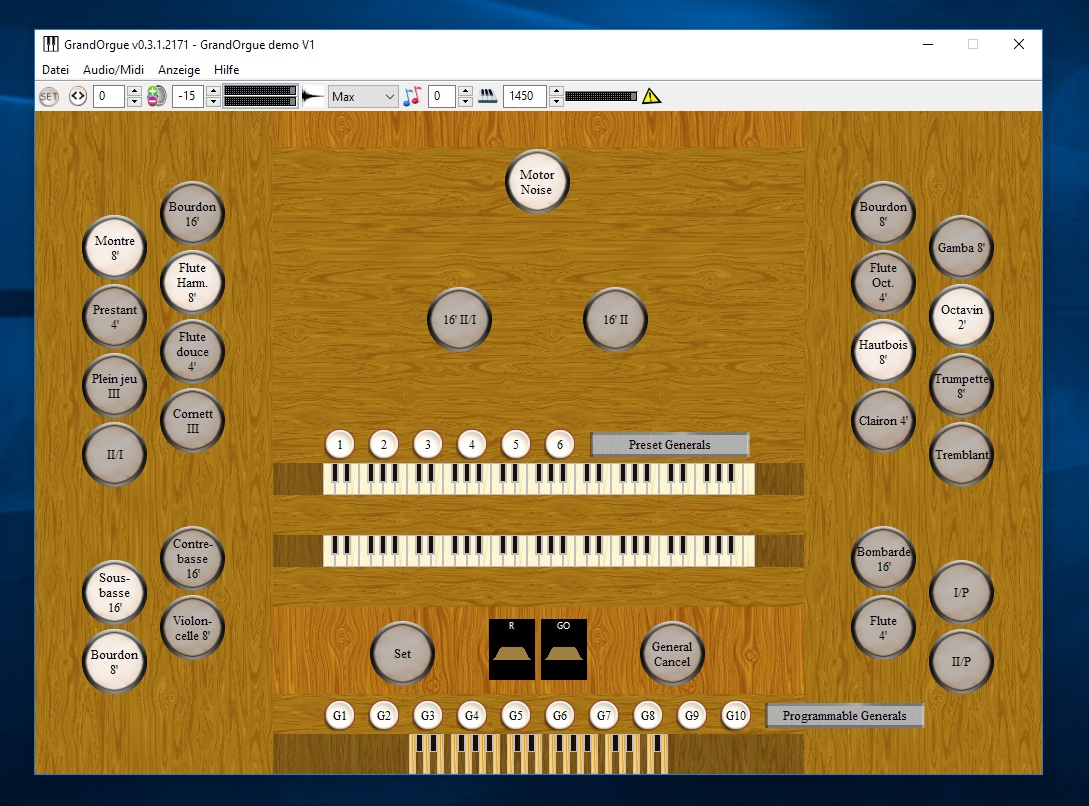
- Developer: GrandOrgue developers
- Stable release: 3.17.3-1 / 11 August 2026; 2 months ago
- Written in: C++
- Operating system: Microsoft Windows, Mac OS X, Linux
- License: GPL-2.0-or-later
- Website: https://github.com/GrandOrgue/grandorgue
- Repository: github.com/GrandOrgue/grandorgue

GrandOrgue is a free and open-source virtual pipe organ simulator, which utilizes the wxWidgets widget toolkit.

GrandOrgue is the free alternative to Hauptwerk software, it is free to download and use. With GrandOrgue, a user may download virtual replicas of real organs around the world, called sample sets. Many free sample sets are available, e.g. from Lars Palo and Piotr Grabowski, but there are also downloadable ODFs (organ definition files) for commercially available organs for Hauptwerk, such as the virtual organ of the Abbey in Caen.

== History ==
The software package known as GrandOrgue was originally developed in 2006 under the name MyOrgan. It was designed as a lightweight, open-source alternative to commercial virtual pipe organ (VPO) programs, loading Organ Definition Files (.organ) and sample sets to map pipe recordings via MIDI interface. Around November 2008, the original author removed the source code and took down the official MyOrgan project page.

In December 2008, a developer rescued the codebase from local backups and established a new repository on SourceForge under the project name OurOrgan, and several developers joined to continue the project. This continuation met with pushback from original MyOrgan owner, who requested a name change on the grounds that the "OurOrgan" moniker was explicitly derivative and shared too close a trademark relation to the original software title.

To preserve the progress of the software without incurring further trademark or legal complications, the development team mutually agreed on a linguistic break, officially renaming the project to GrandOrgue in early 2009.

The selection of the name achieved two distinct purposes:

- Legal Independence: The new title shared no phonetic or branding relationship to MyOrgan, effectively granting the open-source project clear legal grounds to continue development.

- Linguistic Parallelism: "GrandOrgue" was selected as the literal French translation of the German word Hauptwerk (both terms referencing the primary manual and division of a pipe organ). This served as a subtle nod to the commercial software alterative.

In connection with these development roots, the pipe organ console graphic featured on the application's "About" screen, which remains in the software to this day, depicts the historic organ located in Pibrac, a small town near Toulouse, France.

Later in 2009, well after the development team had finalized the transition to the independent GrandOrgue identity, MyOrgan author transferred remaining copyrights and intellectual property to Milan Digital Audio (the commercial developers of Hauptwerk). While the proprietary distribution of the original MyOrgan architecture ceased following the transfer, the open-source project proceeded unhindered under the GrandOrgue banner.

GrandOrgue has since transitioned its active development from SourceForge to a public repository on GitHub. The platform has evolved significantly beyond its foundational architecture, featuring native cross-platform support across Linux, macOS, and Windows, multi-threaded polyphony engines, and optimization for massive, multi-gigabyte modern sample sets, maintaining its status as a prominent free standard for the global VPO community.
