= WxWidgets =

Widget toolkit

wxWidgets
- Original author: Julian Smart
- Developers: Various developers and contributors
- Release: 1992; 34 years ago
- Stable release: 3.3.4 / 10 October 2026; 31 days ago
- Written in: C++
- Operating system: Cross-platform
- Type: Development library
- License: wxWidgets Licence
- Website: wxwidgets.org
- Repository: github.com/wxWidgets/wxWidgets

wxWidgets (formerly wxWindows) is a widget toolkit and tools library for creating graphical user interfaces (GUIs) for cross-platform applications. wxWidgets enables a program's GUI code to compile and run on several computer platforms with no significant code changes. A wide choice of compilers and other tools to use with wxWidgets facilitates development of sophisticated applications. wxWidgets supports a comprehensive range of popular operating systems and graphical libraries, both proprietary and free.

The project was started under the name wxWindows in 1992 by Julian Smart at the University of Edinburgh. The project was renamed wxWidgets in 2004 in response to a trademark claim by Microsoft UK.

It is free and open source software, distributed under the terms of the wxWidgets Licence, which satisfies those who wish to produce for GPL and proprietary software.

== Portability and deployment ==
wxWidgets covers systems such as Microsoft Windows, macOS (Carbon and Cocoa), iOS (Cocoa Touch), Linux/Unix (X11, Motif, and GTK), OpenVMS, OS/2 and AmigaOS. A version for embedded systems is under development.

wxWidgets is used across various industry sectors, most notably by Xerox, Advanced Micro Devices (AMD), Lockheed Martin, NASA and the Center for Naval Analyses. It is also used in the public sector and education by, for example, Dartmouth Medical School, National Human Genome Research Institute, National Center for Biotechnology Information, and many others. wxWidgets is used in many open source projects, and by individual developers.

== History ==
wxWidgets (initially wxWindows; "w" is for Windows, and "x" is for X Window System) was started in 1992 by Julian Smart at the University of Edinburgh. He attained an honours degree in Computational science from the University of St Andrews in 1986, and is still a core developer.

On 20 February 2004, the developers of wxWindows announced that the project was changing its name to wxWidgets, as a result of Microsoft requesting Julian Smart to respect Microsoft's United Kingdom trademark of the term Windows.

Major release versions were 2.4 on 6 January 2003, 2.6 on 21 April 2005 and 2.8.0 on 14 December 2006. Version 3.0 was released on 11 November 2013.

wxWidgets has participated in the Google Summer of Code since 2006.

== License ==
wxWindows Licence
- Debian FSG compatible: Yes
- FSF approved: Yes
- OSI approved: Yes
- GPL compatible: Yes
- Copyleft: Yes
- Linking from code with a different license: Yes
- Website: www.wxwidgets.org

wxWidgets is distributed under a custom made wxWindows Licence, similar to the GNU Lesser General Public License (LGPL), with an exception stating that derived works in binary form may be distributed on the user's own terms. This license is a free software license approved by the FSF, making wxWidgets free software. It has been approved by the Open Source Initiative (OSI).

== Official support ==
=== Supported platforms ===
wxWidgets is supported on the following platforms:

- Windows – wxMSW (64-bits Windows XP up to Windows 11 and 32-bits Windows 3.11 for Workgroups (with Win32s extension) up to Windows 11)
- Linux/Unix – wxGTK, wxX11, wxMotif
- macOS – wxMac (Mac OS X 10.3 using Carbon, Mac OS X 10.5 using Cocoa), wxOSX/Cocoa (32/64-bits Mac OS X 10.7 or later)
- OS/2 – wxOS2, wxPM, wxWidgets for GTK or Motif can be compiled on OS/2
- Embedded platforms – wxEmbedded

==== External ports ====
- Amiga – wxWidgets-AOS: AmigaOS port (Work In Progress)

=== Supported compilers ===
wxWidgets is officially confirmed to work properly with the following compilers:

Toolkit	Compiler	Version
wxMSW	Microsoft Visual Studio – Visual C++	5.0+
wxMSW	Borland C++ (dropped in 3.1.5)	5.5+
wxMSW	C++Builder	2006+
wxMSW	Watcom C++, OpenWatcom	10.6+
wxMSW	CodeWarrior	7+
wxMSW	Cygwin	1.5+
wxMSW	MinGW	2.0+
wxMSW	Digital Mars C/C++ compiler	8.40+
wxGTK	g++	2.95+
wxGTK	Clang++	3.3+
wxGTK	Intel C++ Compiler	9.1+
wxGTK	Sun Studio C/C++	5.9
wxGTK	HP aC++	3.8
wxGTK	IBM XL C/C++	8.0

== Programming language bindings ==
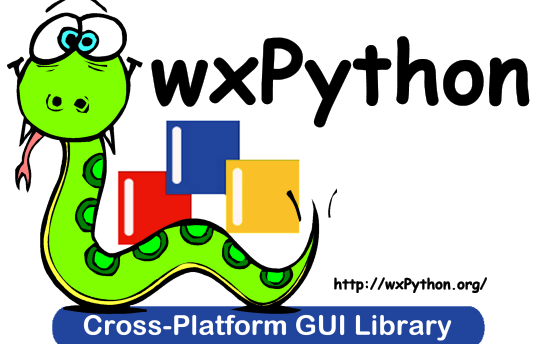
wxPython logo

The wxWidgets library is implemented in C++, with bindings available for many commonly used programming languages.

wxWidgets is best described as a native mode toolkit as it provides a thin abstraction to a platform's native widgets, contrary to emulating the display of widgets using graphic primitives. Calling a native widget on the target platform results in a more native looking interface than toolkits such as Swing (for Java), as well as offering performance and other benefits.

The toolkit is also not restricted to GUI development, having an inter-process communication layer, socket networking functionality, and more.

== RAD tools and IDEs for wxWidgets ==
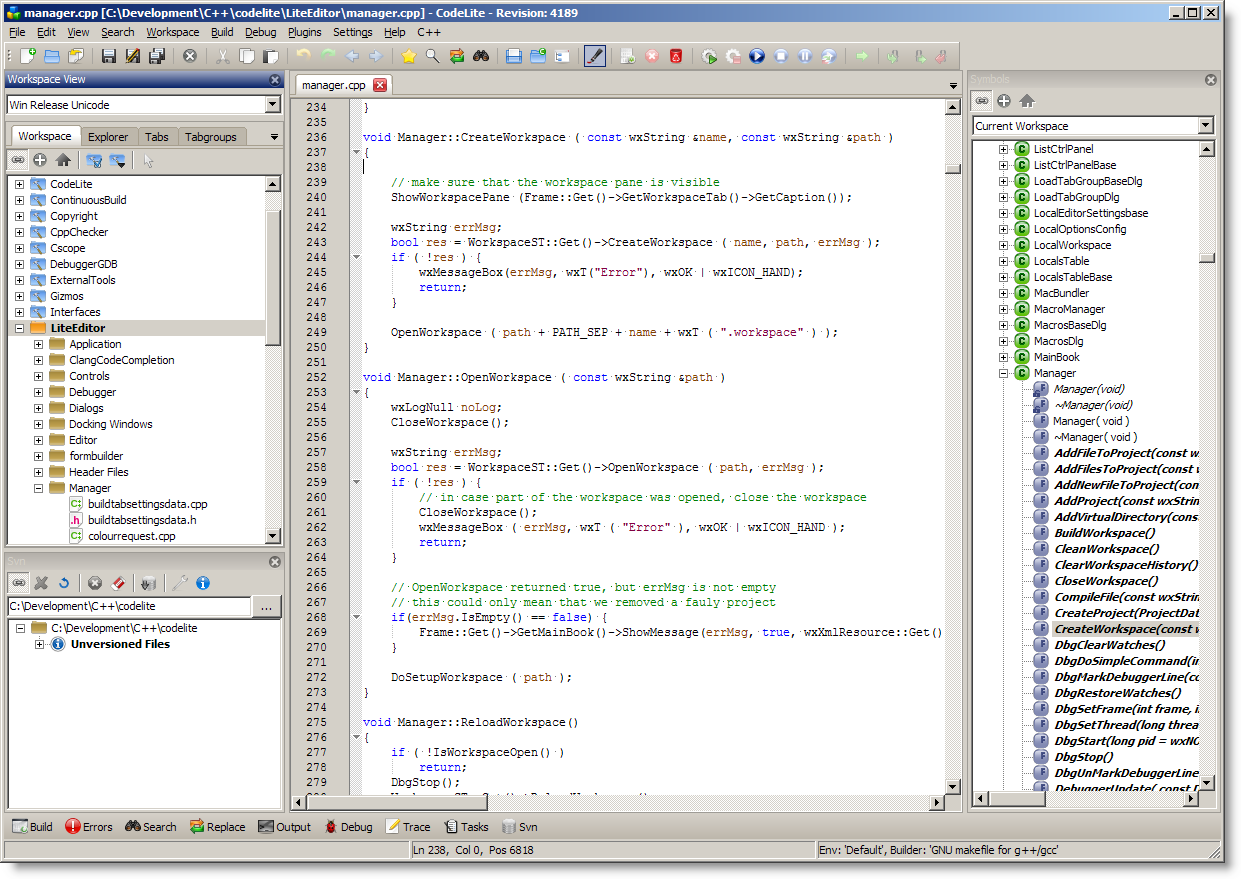
CodeLite under Windows XP

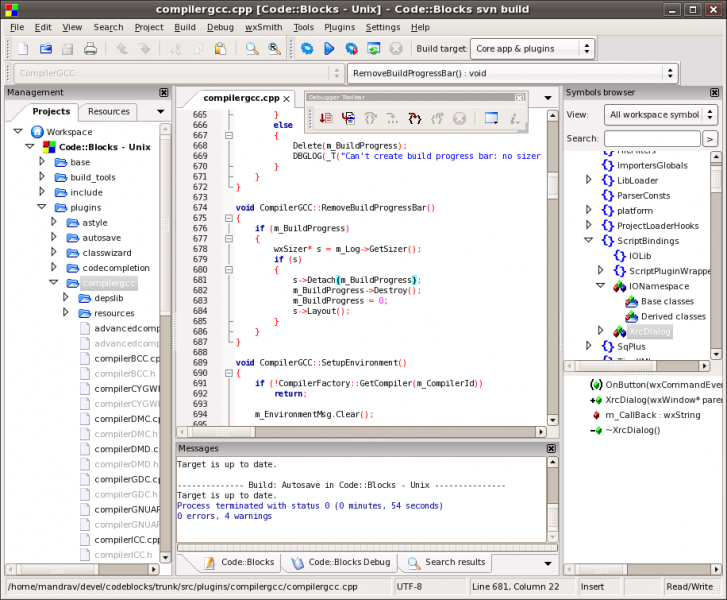
Code::Blocks running under Ubuntu

There are many rapid application development (RAD) and integrated development environment (IDE) tools available. Notable tools include:

- Code::Blocks (via wxSmith plugin)
- CodeLite (via wxCrafter plugin)
- wxFormBuilder

== Applications built using wxWidgets ==
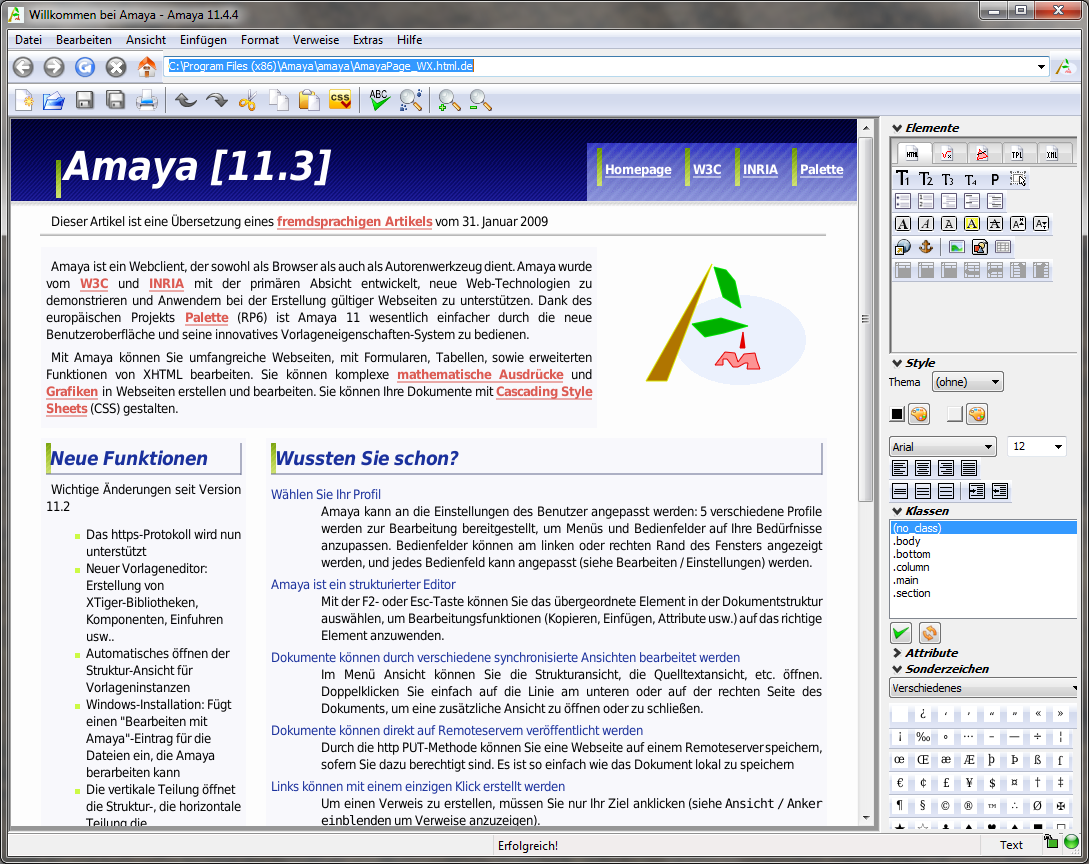
Amaya under Windows 7

Notable applications that use wxWidgets:

- 0 A.D. – a FOSS video game similar to Age of Empires
- Amaya – web authoring tool
- aMule – peer-to-peer file sharing application
- Audacity – cross-platform sound editor (until version 4.0.0)
- BitTorrent – peer-to-peer file sharing application
- Berkeley Open Infrastructure for Network Computing – an open-source middleware system
- Code::Blocks – C/C++ IDE
- CodeLite – simple C++ Editor (Collection of free Tools, implemented by plugins)
- FileZilla – FTP client
- FreeFileSync – a free and open-source file synchronization software
- GrandOrgue – virtual pipe organ simulator
- Guayadeque Music Player – a music player with database
- Hollywood – uses wxWidgets in its RapaGUI plugin
- KiCad – a free software suite for electronic design automation (EDA)
- TortoiseCVS – CVS client
- BeerSmith - Homebrewing software for creating, scaling, and refining beer recipes

== See also ==
- FLTK – a light, cross platform, non-native widget toolkit
- FOX toolkit – a fast, open source, cross-platform widget toolkit
- GTK – the GIMP toolkit, a widget toolkit used by GNOME applications
- gtkmm – C++ version of GTK
- Juce – an extensive cross-platform widget toolkit
- IUP – a multi-platform toolkit for building native graphical user interfaces
- Qt (toolkit) – an application framework used by KDE applications
- U++ – a C++ cross-platform development framework
- Widget toolkit
- List of widget toolkits
