= Fyne (software) =

Graphical toolkit for building cross platform GUIs

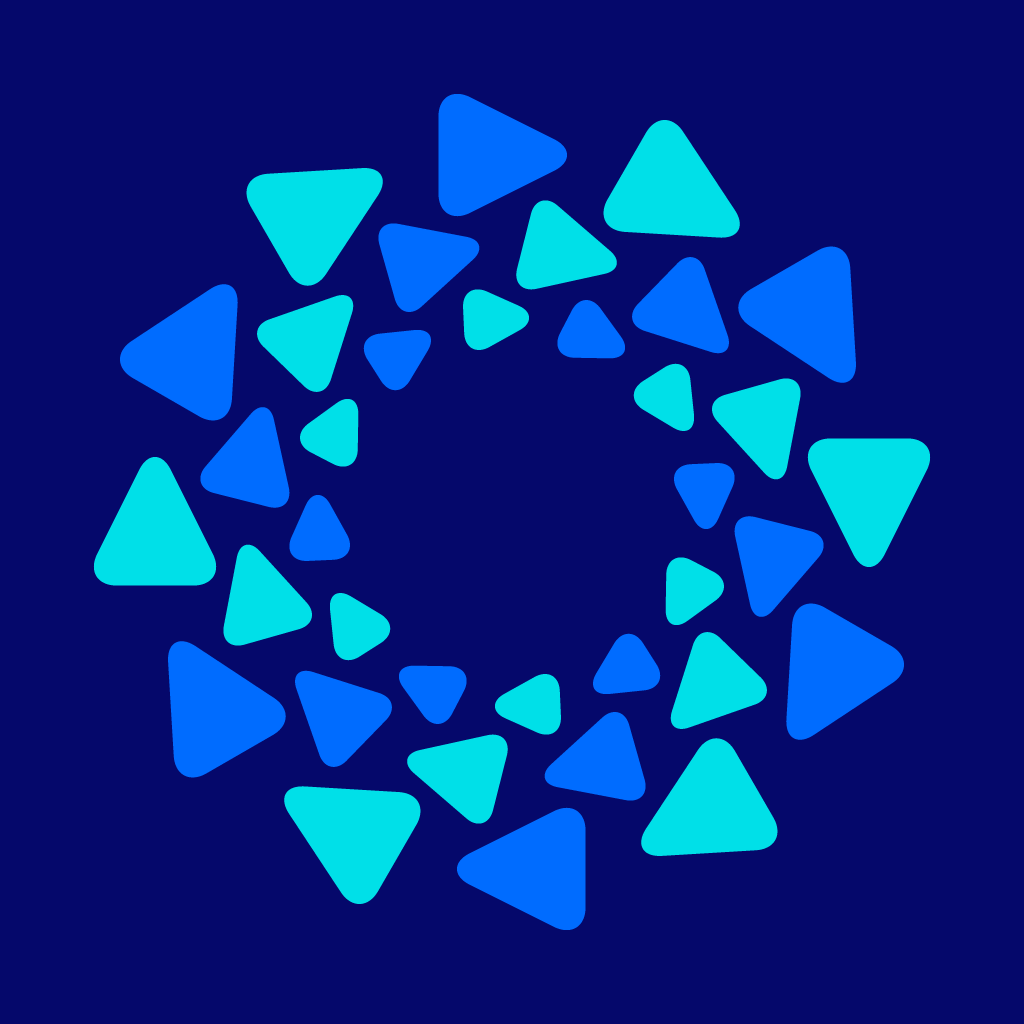

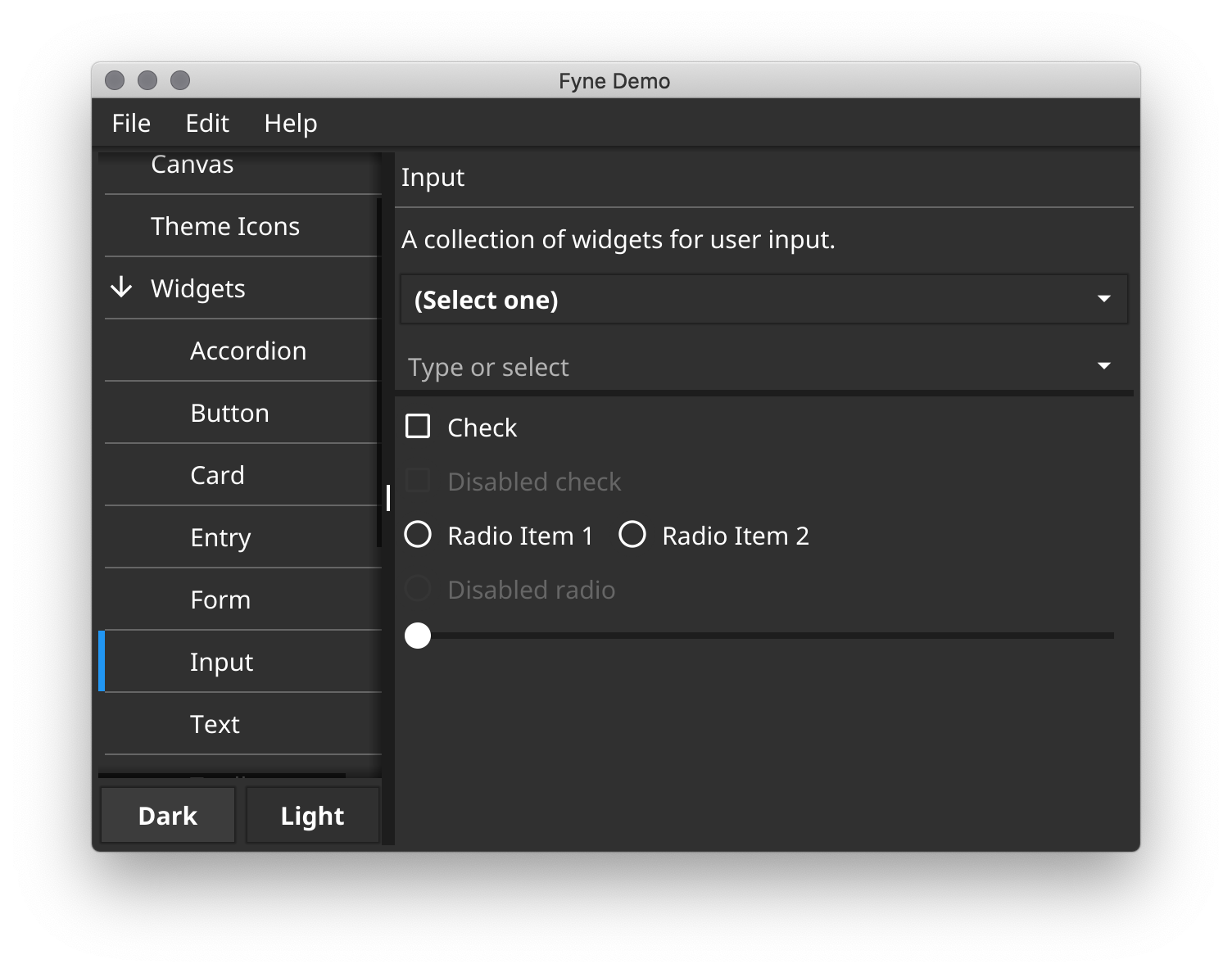
- Screenshot of fyne_demo showcasing many widgets
- Original author: Andrew Williams
- Developers: Andrew Williams, Cedric Bail, Changkun Ou, Charles Daniels, Drew Weymouth, Eli Burch, Jacob Alzén, Luca Corbo, Pablo Fuentes, Simon Dassow, Steve O'Connor, Stephen Houston, Stuart Scott, Tilo Prütz
- Initial release: February 5, 2018; 8 years ago
- Stable release: 2.7.0 / October 16, 2025; 5 months ago
- Written in: Go
- Operating system: Linux, Unix-like, macOS, Windows, IOS, Android (operating system), WebAssembly
- Type: Widget toolkit
- License: New BSD License
- Website: fyne.io
- Repository: github.com/fyne-io/fyne

Fyne is a free and open-source cross-platform widget toolkit for creating graphical user interfaces (GUIs). It allows application software to run on multiple desktop, mobile operating systems, Web browsers (via WebAssembly) and embedded devices (embedded Linux) from a single code base. Fyne is inspired by the principles of Material Design to create applications that look and behave consistently. It uses OpenGL to provide cross-platform GUIs.

Fyne is licensed under the terms of the 3-clause BSD License, supporting the creation of free and proprietary applications. In December 2019 Fyne became the most popular GUI toolkit for Go, by GitHub star count and in early February 2020 it was trending as #1 project in GitHub trending ranks.

== Development ==
Fyne is currently developed by a team of volunteers and is supported by around 100 contributors. The team meet at a conference held each year along with invited speakers and members of the community.

The Fyne toolkit is written primarily in Go.

== Use ==
Several businesses are using the Fyne toolkit for their internal and utility applications, such as Tuffnells and Tailscale

Linux Format published an interview with the founder.

The Fyne project maintains a listing of open source applications built with Fyne.

== See also ==
- List of Go software and tools

== Bibliography ==
- Williams, Andrew (25 February 2019), Hands-On GUI Application Development in Go (1st ed.), Packt, ISBN 978-1-78913-841-2
- Schilli, Mike (1 November 2019), Linux Magazine 229 - Straight to the Point, Linux New Media
- Williams, Andrew (25 January 2021), Building Cross-Platform GUI Applications with Fyne (1st ed.), Packt, ISBN 978-1-80056-316-2
- Bail, Cédric (March 2023), GNU Linux Magazine / France 262 - Application Native Moderne en Go, Les Éditions Diamond
- Bail, Cédric (May 2023), GNU Linux Magazine / France 263 - Application Native Moderne en Go: Manipulation de Données, Tests Unitaires, Intégration et GitHub, Les Éditions Diamond
- Williams, Andrew (August 2023), Linux Magazine 273 - Designing Cross-Platform GUI Apps with Fyne, Linux New Media
- Mohr, Neil (January 2025), Linux Format Issue 323 - Fyne times, Adequate Media Limited
- Schilli, Mike (October 2025), Linux Magazine 299 - Highlight screenshots with Go and the Fyne framework, Linux New Media
