= Zinc Application Framework =

Widget toolkit for cross-platform GUIs

ZAF
- Developer: Professional Software Associates
- Written in: C++
- Operating system: Cross-platform
- Type: Widget toolkit
- Website: psa.inc

The Zinc Application Framework is an application framework, intended for the development of cross-platform software applications with graphical user interface (GUI), using a widget toolkit. Zinc targets both embedded (such as Wind River's VxWorks) and desktop platforms.

== History ==
In 1990, Zinc Software released its first software development package, Zinc Interface Library, as a tool for Borland Turbo C++. This package allowed creation of text and graphics-based user interface, initially only for DOS applications and, since the 2.0 release, also for Windows programs.

In 1994, Zinc Software introduced version 4.0 of its C++ tool under Zinc Application Framework name. Zinc aimed at cross-platform development of the user interface supporting DOS, Windows, Mac and Unix.

With the release of the version 5 in 1997, Zinc Software changed its pricing policy and distributed the "Personal Version" of the Zinc Application Framework free of charge for non-commercial use — including source code and limited only by lack of technical support and distribution rights.

Zinc Software was acquired in 1998 by Wind River and continued to operate as a subsidiary.

In 2004, Zinc Software was sold to Professional Software Associates (PSA).
