= WxHaskell =

Haskell graphical user interface library

wxHaskell
- Original authors: Jeremy O'Donoghue; Eric Kow; Francesco Gazzetta
- Initial release: March 23, 2008; 17 years ago
- Stable release: 0.92.3 / April 28, 2017; 8 years ago
- Preview release: unnumbered / June 10, 2024; 18 months ago
- Repository: codeberg.org/wxHaskell
- Written in: C++
- Operating system: GTK, X Window System, macOS, Windows
- Platform: IA-32, x86-64
- Available in: English
- Type: GUI library for Haskell
- License: wxWindows

wxHaskell is a portable and native graphical user interface (GUI) library for the programming language Haskell, built on wxWidgets. It is often used by those wanting to develop a graphical user interface (GUI) with a functional programming language.

== Applications ==
=== High-level GUI libraries built on it ===
wxHaskell is a middle-level GUI library. Several experimental high-level GUI library approaches are implemented on wxHaskell:

- Reactive-banana
- FunctionalForms
- wxFruit
- Phooey

In contrast, the high-level GUI libraries FG and Grapefruit are implemented on the middle-level Gtk2Hs, which is based on GTK2.

All of these high-level libraries are experimental, using advanced mathematics concepts in their approach (see Arrow (computer science)).
