= Gtk2-Perl =

Gtk2-Perl and Gtk3-Perl
- Stable release: Gtk2: 1.24.92b Gtk3:v0.017 / July 3, 2014; 11 years ago July 3, 2014; 11 years ago
- Written in: Perl
- Type: Language binding
- License: GNU Lesser General Public License 2.1
- Website: gtk2-perl.sourceforge.net

Gtk2-Perl is a set of wrappers for the Perl programming language around the GTK and further GNOME libraries. Gtk-Perl is free and open-source software licensed under the GNU Lesser General Public License (LGPL) version 2.1. Developers and interested parties can usually be found on the IRC channel #gtk-perl on irc.gnome.org.

Gtk2-Perl is part of the official GNOME Platform Bindings release.

== Example ==
use Gtk2 '-init';

$window = Gtk2::Window->new('toplevel');
$window->set_title("Hello World!");

$button = Gtk2::Button->new("Press me");
$button->signal_connect(clicked => sub { print "Hello again - the button was pressed\n"; });

$window->add($button);
$window->show_all;

Gtk2->main;

0;

The sample program creates a GTK Window titled "Hello World!". The window contains a Button labelled "Press me." When the button is pressed, the message "Hello again - the button was pressed" is displayed on the console via the callback inside the anonymous subroutine connected to the "clicked" signal.
