= LessTif =

Programming toolkit

- Developer: Hungry Programmers
- Final release: 0.95.2 / May 27, 2009
- Written in: C
- Operating system: Unix-like
- Successor: Motif under LGPL license
- Type: Widget toolkit
- License: GNU Lesser General Public License
- Website: web.archive.org/web/20120723010742/http://lesstif.sourceforge.net/

LessTif is a defunct free software reimplementation or clone of the Motif computer programming toolkit. The project aimed for full source- and binary-code compatibility with Motif. While this was not achieved, many Motif applications could run with LessTif or be compiled with it.

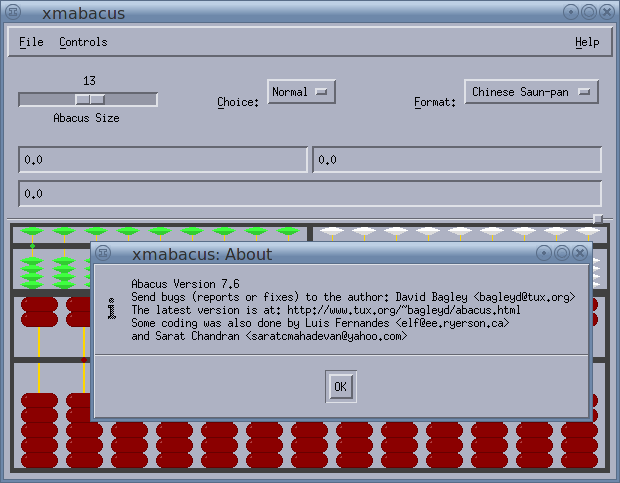
A screenshot of a program using LessTif (xmabacus)

As opposed to Motif, which was distributed until October 2012 under a proprietary license that could require the payment of royalties, LessTif was developed under the GNU Lesser General Public License (LGPL). The license of Motif was the main motivation for the development of LessTif. Following the release of the original Motif toolkit as open source under the LGPL in 2012, the LessTif project was discontinued.

== See also ==
- History of free software
