= X Athena Widgets =

GUI widget library for the X Window System

- Type: Widget toolkit
- Repository: gitlab.freedesktop.org/xorg/lib/libxaw

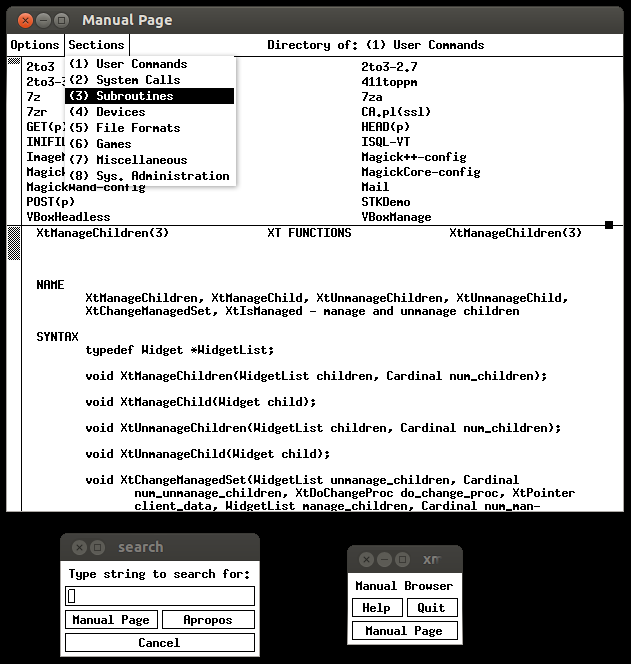
The xman program, written using Xaw

X Window System graphics stack

X Athena Widgets or Xaw is a GUI widget library for the X Window System. Developed as part of Project Athena, Xaw was written under the auspices of the MIT X Consortium as a sample widget set built on X Toolkit Intrinsics (Xt); Xt and Xaw are collectively known as the X Toolkit. Xaw has been largely superseded by more sophisticated toolkits like Motif, and later toolkits such as GTK, and Qt, but it is still maintained (by the X.Org Foundation) and is available as part of most X Window System installations. The library, like other core parts of X, is licensed under the MIT License.

In a talk for USENIX, X pioneer Jim Gettys remarked that although Athena widgets were "ugly", they were often used in the period of X history that he describes as the "GUI wars", as a safe alternative to the competing Motif and Open Look toolkits.
