= Flutter (software) =

Software development kit

- Original author: Google
- Developers: Google and community
- Release: Alpha (v0.0.6) / May 12, 2017; 9 years ago
- Stable release: 3.47.0 / 12 August 2026; 2 months ago
- Written in: Dart, C/C++
- Platform: Android, iOS, Google Fuchsia, Web platform, Linux, macOS and Windows
- Type: Application framework
- License: New BSD License
- Website: flutter.dev
- Repository: github.com/flutter/flutter

Flutter is an open-source UI software development kit created by Google. It can be used to develop cross platform applications from a single codebase for the web, Fuchsia, Android, iOS, Linux, macOS, and Windows. First described in 2015, Flutter was released in May 2017. Flutter is used internally by Google in apps such as Google Pay and Google Earth as well as by other software developers including ByteDance and Alibaba.

Flutter ships applications with its own rendering engine which directly outputs pixel data to the screen. This is in contrast to many other UI frameworks that rely on the target platform to provide a rendering engine, such as native Android apps which rely on the device-level Android SDK or iOS SDK which use the target platform's built-in UI stack. Flutter's control of its rendering pipeline simplifies multi-platform support as identical UI code can be used for all target platforms. One of Flutter’s key features is hot reload, which allows developers to see code changes instantly without restarting the application.

== Architecture ==
The basic component in a Flutter program is a "widget", which can in turn consist of other widgets. A widget describes the logic, interaction, and design of a UI element with an implementation similar to React. Unlike other cross-platform toolkits such as React Native and .NET MAUI that draw widgets using native platform components, Flutter renders widgets itself on a per-pixel basis. Flutter has two types of widgets: stateless and stateful. Stateless widgets only update if their inputs change, meaning they otherwise won't need to be rebuilt when other elements of the screen change, while stateful widgets can call the setState() method to update an internal state and redraw. Although widgets are the primary method of constructing Flutter applications, they can also be bypassed in favor of directly drawing on a canvas. This feature has been occasionally used to implement game engines in Flutter.

The Flutter framework contains two sets of widgets that conform to specific design languages: Material Design widgets implement Google's design language of the same name, and Cupertino widgets implement Apple's iOS Human interface guidelines. Flutter allows the developer to use either set of widgets on either platform. Developers can use Cupertino widgets on Android.

Flutter apps are written in the Dart language. Release versions of Flutter apps on all platforms use ahead-of-time (AOT) compilation except for on the Web where code is transpiled to JavaScript or WebAssembly. Flutter inherits Dart's Pub package manager and software repository, which allows users to publish and use custom packages as well as Flutter-specific plugins. The Foundation library, written in Dart, provides basic classes and functions that are used to construct applications using Flutter, such as APIs to communicate with the engine.

Flutter's engine, written primarily in C++, provides low-level rendering support using either Google's Skia graphics library or the custom "Impeller" graphics layer, which is enabled by default on iOS and Android API 29 and higher. The engine interfaces with platform-specific SDKs such as those provided by Android and iOS to implement features like accessibility, file and network I/O, native plugin support, etc.

== History ==
The first version of Flutter was known as "Sky" and ran on the Android operating system. It was unveiled at the 2015 Dart developer summit with the stated intent of being able to render consistently at 120 frames per second. On December 4, 2018, Flutter 1.0 was released at the Flutter conference in London.

On May 6, 2020, the Dart software development kit (SDK) version 2.8 and Flutter 1.17.0 were released, adding support for the Metal API.

On March 3, 2021, Google released Flutter 2 during an online Flutter Engage event. It added a Canvas-based renderer for web in addition to the HTML-based renderer and early-access desktop application support for Windows, macOS, and Linux. It also shipped with Dart 2.0 which included support for null-safety. Null safety was initially optional as it was a breaking change and was made mandatory in Dart 3 released in 2023.

On May 12, 2022, Flutter 3 and Dart 2.17 were released with support for all desktop platforms as stable.

On October 27, 2024, a number of Flutter community developers announced Flock, a fork of Flutter intended to be easier to contribute to while still keeping in sync with all changes made in the upstream code base.

In 2025, Google continued Flutter's evolution with enhanced modular architecture, foldable device support, and ARM IoT optimizations as outlined in the updated roadmap.

== See also ==
- List of open-source application frameworks
- List of platform-independent GUI libraries
- Dart (programming language)
