= Ultimate++ =

GUI framework toolkit

U++
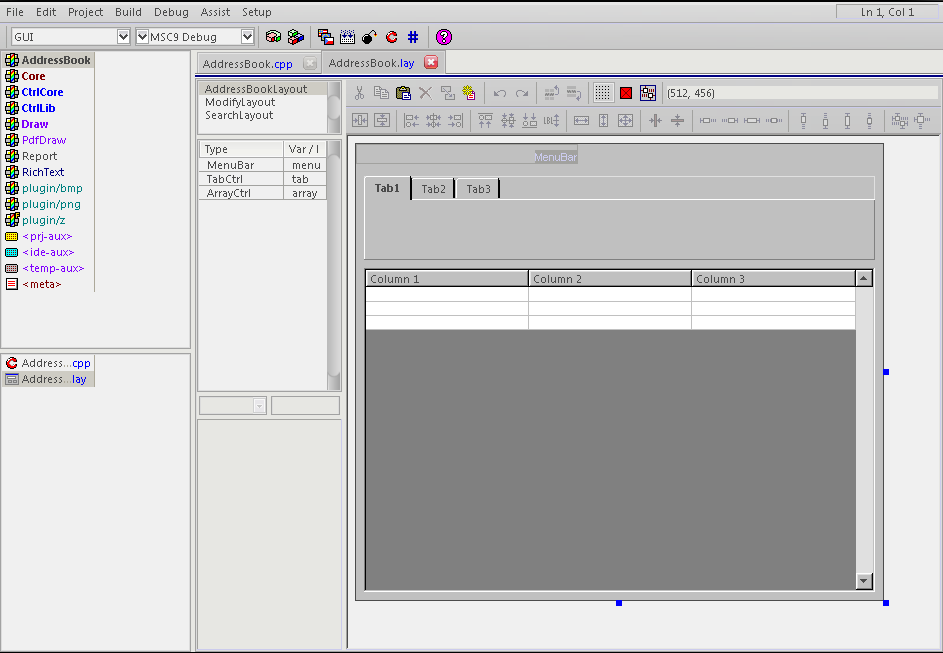
- TheIDE from 2010
- Developer: U++ team
- Release: 2004; 22 years ago
- Stable release: 2026.1 / 4 April 2026; 6 months ago
- Written in: C++
- Operating system: Unix / Linux / FreeBSD (X11), Windows, Windows CE, MacOS
- Platform: Cross-platform
- Type: Application framework
- License: BSD license
- Website: www.ultimatepp.org
- Repository: sourceforge.net/projects/upp/files/upp/

U++, formally known as Ultimate++, is a rapid application development framework written in C++ that aims to reduce the code complexity of typical desktop applications by including all necessary toolkits into a single C++ framework. Programs created with U++ work on multiple operating systems and hardware architectures with performance without needing to write platform-specific code.

It has its own integrated development environment called TheIDE that is designed to handle all library features and plugins.

== Features ==
Some key features includes

- An IDE with a GUI designer
- Extensive use of RAII and auto pointers-like mechanisms to avoid manual memory management and limit the use of pointers in the code
- Can emulate native widgets look and feel. On X11 systems, Ultimate++ supports GTK+ widgets look and feel.
- The standard distribution comes with U++ sources included.
- Uses NTL as a template system instead of STL.
- Supports databases, with libraries to connect with various database systems.
- Designed for high-performance application use cases with a low memory footprint and efficient use of system resources.
- Retains backward compatibility, allowing developers to upgrade to new versions of the framework without issues.
- Provides support for Unicode to make applications in multiple languages.
- Document editor, Debugger, auto completion and Icon Designer for making tool icons with less effort.
- Possible to work with Android NDK and SDK
- Web development and other features

== Supports ==
=== Operating system ===
- Windows
- macOS
- GNU / Linux
- Unix-Like OS

=== Compiler or port ===
- GCC
- Clang
- Visual C++
- MinGW
- Mingw-w64

=== Database ===
- Microsoft SQL
- MySQL
- PostgreSQL
- Sqlite

== Software built on U++ ==
Example applications using U++ are:

- BEMRosetta - hydrodynamic coefficients viewer and converter
- Openwind - wind farm design software
- UppCAD - multipurpose CAD system
- WordNet Browser - browser for WordNet

== See also ==
- GTK+
- Widget toolkit
- List of widget toolkits
- List of open-source application frameworks
