= Language binding =

Interface allowing one programming language to use a library written in another

In programming and software design, a binding is an application programming interface (API) that provides glue code specifically made to allow a programming language to use a foreign library or operating system service (one that is not native to that language).

== Characteristics ==
Binding generally refers to a mapping of one thing to another. In the context of software libraries, bindings are wrapper libraries that bridge two programming languages, so that a library written for one language can be used in another language. Many software libraries are written in system programming languages such as C or C++. To use such libraries from another language, usually of higher-level, such as Java, Common Lisp, Scheme, Python, or Lua, a binding to the library must be created in that language, possibly requiring recompiling the language's code, depending on the amount of modification needed. However, most languages offer a foreign function interface, such as Python's and OCaml's ctypes, and Embeddable Common Lisp's cffi and uffi.

For example, Python bindings are used when an extant C library, written for some purpose, is to be used from Python. Another example is libsvn which is written in C to provide an API to access the Subversion software repository. To access Subversion from within Java code, libsvnjavahl can be used, which depends on libsvn being installed and acts as a bridge between the language Java and libsvn, thus providing an API that invokes functions from libsvn to do the work.

Major motives to create library bindings include software reuse, to reduce reimplementing a library in several languages, and the difficulty of implementing some algorithms efficiently in some high-level languages.

== Object models ==
- Common Object Request Broker Architecture (CORBA) – cross-platform-language model
- Component Object Model (COM) – Microsoft Windows only cross-language model
- Distributed Component Object Model (DCOM) – extension enabling COM to work over networks
- Cross Platform Component Object Model (XPCOM) – Mozilla applications cross-platform model
- Common Language Infrastructure – .NET Framework cross-platform-language model
- Freedesktop.org D-Bus – open cross-platform-language model

== Porting ==
- Portable object – cross-platform-language object model definition

== See also ==
- Application programming interface (API)
- Application binary interface (ABI)
- Calling convention
- Embedded SQL
- Name mangling
- Simplified Wrapper and Interface Generator (SWIG) – interface binding generator from many languages to many languages, open-source
- Wrapper function
