= Video games and Linux =

Playing video games on Linux-based operating systems

Linux-based operating systems can be used for playing video games. Because fewer games natively support the Linux kernel than Windows, various software has been made to run Windows games, software, and programs, such as Wine, Cedega, DXVK, and Proton, and managers such as Lutris and PlayOnLinux. The Linux gaming community has a presence on the internet with users who attempt to run games that are not officially supported on Linux.

== History ==
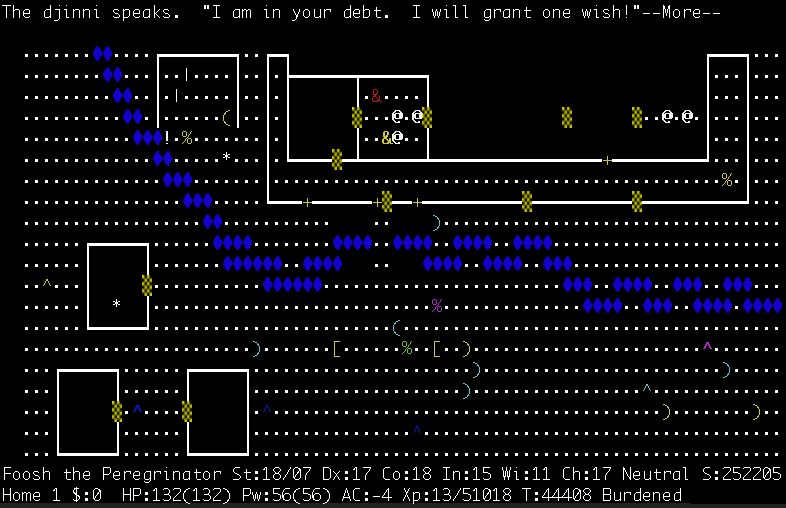
NetHack, a primordial Unix game

Linux gaming started largely as an extension of the already present Unix gaming scene, which dates back to that system's conception in 1969 with the game Space Travel and the first edition in 1971, with both systems sharing many similar titles. These games were mostly either arcade and parlour type games or text adventures using libraries like curses. A notable example of this are the "BSD Games", a collection of interactive fiction and other text-mode amusements. The free software philosophy and open-source methodology which drove the development of the operating system in general also spawned the creation of various early free games.

Popular early titles included Netrek and the various XAsteroids, XBattle, XBill, XBoing, X-Bomber, XConq, XDigger, XEmeraldia, XEvil, XGalaga, XGammon, XLander, XLife, XMahjong, XMine, XSoldier, XPilot, XRobots, XRubiks, XShogi, XScavenger, XTris, XTron, XTic and XTux games using the X Window System. Other games targeted or also supported the SVGAlib library allowing them to run without a windowing system, such as LinCity, Maelstrom, Sasteroids, and SABRE. The General Graphics Interface was also used for games like U.R.B.A.N The Cyborg Project and Dave Gnukem ported from DOS. As the operating system itself grew and expanded, the amount of free and open-source games also increased in scale and complexity, with both clones of historically popular releases beginning with BZFlag, LinCity, and Freeciv, and original creations such as Rocks'n'Diamonds, Cube, The Battle for Wesnoth, and Tux Racer.

=== 1994 ===
Doom was one of the first major commercial games to be released for Linux.

The beginning of Linux as a gaming platform for commercial video games is widely credited to have begun in 1994 when Dave D. Taylor ported the game Doom to Linux, and many other systems, during his spare time. Shareware copies of the game were included on various Linux discs, including those packed in with reference books.

Ancient Domains of Mystery was also released for Linux in 1994 by Thomas Biskup, building on the roguelike legacy of games such as Moria and its descendent Angband, but more specifically Hack and NetHack.

=== 1995 ===
From there Taylor would also help found the development studio Crack dot Com, which released the video game Abuse, with the game's Linux port even being distributed by Linux vendors Red Hat and Caldera. The studio's never finished Golgotha was also slated to be released by Red Hat in box.

In 1991 DUX Software contracted Don Hopkins to port SimCity to Unix, which he ported to Linux in 1995 and eventually released as open source for the OLPC XO laptop.

A website named The Linux Game Tome, also known as HappyPenguin after its URL, was begun by Tessa Lau in 1995 to catalogue games created for or ported to Linux from the SunSITE game directories and other classic X11 games for a set of just over 100 titles.

=== 1996–1997 ===
id Software, the original developers of Doom, also continued to release their products for Linux. Their game Quake was ported to Linux via X11 in 1996, once again by Dave D. Taylor working in his free time. An SVGALib version was also later produced by Greg Alexander in 1997 using recently leaked source code, but was later mainlined by id. Later id products continued to be ported by Zoid Kirsch and Timothee Besset, a practice that continued until the studio's acquisition by ZeniMax Media in 2009. Initially, Zoid Kirsch was responsible for maintaining the Linux version of Quake and porting QuakeWorld to Linux.

Inner Worlds was released for and developed on Linux. The UNIX Book of Games, a 1996 publication by Janice Winsor, described various games with an accompanying CD-ROM containing executables and source code for Linux and SCO Unix.

=== 1998 ===
The Simple DirectMedia Layer provided platform independent abstraction.

The Linux Game Tome was taken over by Bob Zimbinski in 1998 eventually growing to over 2000 entries, sponsored by retailer Penguin Computing and later LGP until it went down in 2013, although mirrors still exist.

The site LinuxGames covered news and commentary from November 1998 until its host Atomicgamer went down in 2015. It was established by Marvin Malkowski, head of the Telefragged gaming network, alongside Al Koskelin and Dustin Reyes; Reyes died 8 August 2023.

Zoid Kirsch from id Software ported Quake II to Linux. Two programmers from Origin ported Ultima Online to Linux and MP Entertainment released an adventure game Hopkins FBI for Linux

On 9 November 1998, a new software firm called Loki Software was founded by Scott Draeker, a former lawyer who became interested in porting games to Linux after being introduced to the system through his work as a software licensing attorney. Loki, although a commercial failure, is credited with the birth of the modern Linux game industry. Loki developed several free software tools, such as the Loki installer (also known as Loki Setup), and supported the development of the Simple DirectMedia Layer, and starting the OpenAL audio library project. These are still often credited as being the cornerstones of Linux game development. They were also responsible for bringing nineteen high-profile games to the platform before its closure in 2002.

=== 1999 ===
Loki published Civilization: Call to Power, Eric's Ultimate Solitaire, Heretic II, Heroes of Might and Magic III, Railroad Tycoon II: Gold Edition, Quake III: Arena, and Unreal Tournament for Linux.

Loki's initial success also attracted other firms to invest in the Linux gaming market, such as Tribsoft, Hyperion Entertainment, Macmillan Digital Publishing USA, Titan Computer, Xatrix Entertainment, Philos Laboratories, and Vicarious Visions.

The ports of Quake and Quake II were released physically by Macmillan Computer Publishing USA, while Quake III was released for Linux by Loki Software. Red Hat had previously passed on publishing Quake for Linux, since it was not open-source at the time.

Philos Laboratories released a Linux version of Theocracy on the retail disk. Ryan "Ridah" Feltrin from Xatrix Entertainment released a Linux version of Kingpin: Life of Crime.

BlackHoleSun Software released Krilo and Futureware 2001 released a trading simulation Würstelstand for Linux.

The Indrema Entertainment System (also known as the L600) was also in development since 1999 as a Linux-based game console and digital media player, but production halted in 2001 due to a lack of investment, although the TuxBox project attempted a continuation.

=== 2000 ===
Loki published Descent 3, Heavy Gear II, SimCity 3000, and Soldier of Fortune for Linux. They also released the expansion Descent 3: Mercenary as the downloadable Linux installer.

Hyperion Entertainment ported Sin to Linux published by Titan Computer. Vicarious Visions ported the space-flight game Terminus to Linux. Mountain King Studios released a port of Raptor: Call of the Shadows and CipSoft published the Linux client of Tibia.

Boutell.com ported Exile III: Ruined World to Linux, which was a game created by Spiderweb Software.

During this time Michael Simms founded Tux Games, one of the first online Linux game retailers, later followed by Fun 4 Tux, Wupra, ixsoft, and LinuxPusher.

The period also saw a number of commercial compilations released, such as 100 Great Linux Games by Global Star Software, Linux Games by Walnut Creek CDROM, Linux Games++ by Pacific Hitech, Linux Cubed Series 8 LINUX Games by Omeron Systems, Best Linux Games by SOT Finnish Software Engineering, LinuxCenter Games Collection, Linux Games & Entertainment for X Windows by Hemming, Linux Spiele & Games by more software, Linux Spiele by Franzis Verlag, and play it! Linux: Die Spielesammlung by S.A.D. Software.

Numerous Linux distributions and collections packed in Loki games and demos, including Red Hat Linux, Corel Linux and WordPerfect Office, and the complete Eric's Ultimate Solitaire bundled with PowerPlant by TheKompany. Easy Linux 2000 similarly bundled in a copy of the Linux version of Hopkins FBI.

=== 2001 ===
Loki published Heavy Metal: F.A.K.K.², Kohan: Immortal Sovereigns, Mindrover: The Europa Project, Myth II: Soulblighter, Postal Plus, Rune, Rune: Halls of Valhalla, Sid Meier's Alpha Centauri, and Tribes 2 for Linux.

Linux Game Publishing was founded in 2001 in response to the impending demise of Loki. Creature Labs ported Creatures: Internet Edition to Linux, which was published by LGP.

Hyperion Entertainment ported Shogo: Mobile Armor Division to Linux, and Tribsoft created a Linux version of Jagged Alliance 2, both published by Titan Computer.

Illwinter Game Design released Conquest of Elysium II and Dominions: Priests, Prophets & Pretenders for Linux. Introversion Software released Uplink for Linux.

BlackHoleSun Software released Bunnies, and worked on Atlantis: The Underwater City – Interactive Storybook published by Sterling Entertainment.

GLAMUS GmbH released a Linux version of their game Mobility and Oliver Hamann released the driving game Odyssey by Car.

Small Rockets published Small Rockets BackGammon, Small Rockets Mah Jongg, and Small Rockets Poker for Linux.

The company TransGaming marketed as a monthly subscription its own proprietary fork of Wine called WineX in October 2001, later renamed Cedega in 2004 and discontinued in 2011, which aimed for greater compatibility with Microsoft Windows games. A special Gaming Edition of Mandrake Linux 8.1 was released that featured WineX packed in with The Sims. The fact that the fork of Wine did not release source back to the main project was also a point of contention, despite promises to release code after achieving a set number of subscribers.

The release of ScummVM in 2001, Dosbox in 2002, and video game console emulators like MAME from 1997 and released as open source in 2016, helped make Linux a viable platform for retro gaming (facilitated by the RetroArch frontend since 2010). This is especially the case for the GP2X series of handheld game consoles by GamePark Holdings in addition to the community driven Pandora and DragonBox Pyra. Dedicated emulation setups are also built on single-board computers like the Raspberry Pi released in 2012, which are most often Linux based including with Raspberry Pi OS. Wine is also useful for running older Windows games, including 16-bit and even some 32-bit applications that no longer work on modern 64-bit Windows. The Sharp Zaurus personal data assistants adopted a Linux derived system called OpenZaurus, which attracted its own gaming scene. This was also the case with the Agenda VR3, advertised as the first "pure Linux PDA".

=== 2002 ===
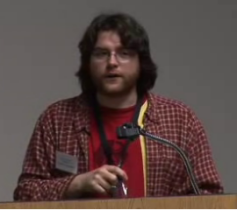
Former Loki Software employee Ryan C. Gordon

After Loki's closure, the Linux game market experienced some changes. Although some new firms, such as Linux Game Publishing and RuneSoft, would largely continue the role of a standard porting house, the focus began to change with Linux game proponents encouraging game developers to port their game products themselves or through individual contractors. Influential to this was Ryan C. Gordon, a former Loki employee who would over the next decade port several game titles to multiple platforms, including Linux.

Ryan ported America's Army, Candy Cruncher, Serious Sam: The First Encounter, and Unreal Tournament 2003 to Linux.

Linux Game Publishing had initially tried to pick up the support rights to many of Loki's titles, but in the end it was only able to acquire the rights to MindRover: The Europa Project. They released the updated version of Mindrover and its downloadable update for owners of the old Loki version.

Return to Castle Wolfenstein was released for Linux and with the Linux port done in-house by Timothee Besset

Chronic logic released Bridge Construction Set and Triptych for Linux.

Sunspire Studios released in retail commercial expansion of the game titled Tux Racer.

=== 2003 ===
Ryan ported Devastation, Medal of Honor Allied Assault, and Serious Sam: The Second Encounter to Linux.

LGP took interest in publishing Pyrogon games on physical CDs and they released Candy Cruncher. Mathieu Pinard from Tribsoft got LGP in contact with Cyberlore to save the Linux port of Majesty because Titan Computer get out of Linux publishing. This turn of events helped LGP to release a Majesty for Linux after Pinard closed his company in 2002.

Timothee Bessett from id Software ported Wolfenstein: Enemy Territory to Linux.

Around this time many companies, starting with id Software, also began to release legacy source code leading to a proliferation of source ports of older games to Linux and other systems. This also helped expand the already existing free and open-source gaming scene, especially with regards to the creation of free first person shooters. In addition, numerous game engine recreations have been produced to varying levels of accuracy using reverse engineering or underlying engine code supporting the original game files including on Linux and other niche systems.

=== 2004 ===
Ryan ported Unreal Tournament 2004 to Linux for Epic Games and Timothee Bessett from id Software ported Doom 3 to Linux.

David Hedbor, founder and main programmer of Eon Games ported NingPo MahJong and Hyperspace Delivery Boy! to Linux, which later were published by LGP.

=== 2005–2007 ===
Ryan ported Postal²: Share the Pain to Linux published by LGP.

CodeWeavers offered an enhanced version of Wine called CrossOver Games. The reliance on such compatibility layers remains controversial with concerns that it hinders growth in native development, although this approach was defended based on Loki's demise. PlayOnLinux, established in 2007, provides a community alternative, with various guides being written on how to get games to run through Wine.

=== 2008–2011 ===
Relative sales of first Humble Indie Bundle across systems
1. Windows (61.9%)
2. Mac (21.6%)
3. Linux (16.5%)
Relative payments across systems
1. Windows (52.1%)
2. Mac (23.0%)
3. Linux (24.9%)

The Linux gaming market also started to experience some growth towards the end of the decade with the rise of independent video game development, with many "indie" developers favouring support for multiple platforms. The Humble Indie Bundle initiatives inaugurated in 2010 helped to formally demonstrate this trend, with Linux users representing a sizable population of their purchase base, and as being the most consistently financially generous in spending. The Humble Indie Bundle V in 2012 faced controversy for featuring a Wine-based release of Limbo prepared by CodeWeavers, while a native version was later released in 2014. Humble eventually began offering Windows-only games in their bundles and on their store.

In 2009, the small indie game company Entourev LLC published Voltley to Linux which is the first commercial exclusive game for this operating system. In the same year, LGP released Shadowgrounds which was the first commercial game for Linux using the Nvidia PhysX middleware. The GamingOnLinux website was launched on 4 July 2009, and eventually succeeded LinuxGames as the main source of news and commentary.

The release of a Linux version of Desura in 2011, a digital distribution platform with a main focus on small independent developers, was heralded by several commentators as an important step to greater acknowledgement of Linux as a gaming platform. Shortly before this, Canonical launched the Ubuntu Software Center which also sold digital games. The digital store Gameolith also launched in 2011 focused principally on Linux before expanding in 2012 and closing in 2014.

=== 2012–2016 ===
In July 2012, game developer and content distributor Valve announced a port of their Source engine for Linux as well as stating their intention to release their Steam digital distribution service for Linux. The potential availability of a Linux Steam client had already attracted other developers to consider porting their titles to Linux, including previously Mac OS only porting houses such as Aspyr Media and Feral Interactive.

In November 2012, Unity Technologies ported their Unity engine and game creation system to Linux starting with version 4. All of the games created with the Unity engine can now be ported to Linux easily.

In September 2013, Valve announced that they were releasing a gaming oriented Linux based operating system called SteamOS with Valve saying they had "come to the conclusion that the environment best suited to delivering value to customers is an operating system built around Steam itself." This was used for their Steam Machine platform released on 10 November 2015, and discontinued in 2018.

In March 2014, GOG.com announced they would begin to support Linux titles on their DRM free store starting the same year, after previously stating they would not be able due to too many distributions. GOG.com began their initial roll out on 24 July 2014, by offering 50 Linux supporting titles, including several new to the platform.

Despite previous statements, GOG have confirmed they have no plans to port their Galaxy client to Linux. The free software Lutris started in 2010, GameHub from 2019, MiniGalaxy from 2020, and the Heroic Games Launcher from 2021, offer support for GOG as well as the Epic Games Store, Ubisoft Connect and Origin.

In March and April 2014, two major developers Epic Games and Crytek announced Linux support for their next generation engines Unreal Engine 4 and CryEngine respectively.

Towards the end of 2014, the game host itch.io announced that Linux would be supported with their developing open source game client. This was fully launched simultaneously on Windows, Mac OS X, and Linux on 15 December 2015. The service had supported Linux since it was first unveiled on 3 March 2013, with creator Leaf Corcoran personally a Linux user. The similar Game Jolt service also supports Linux and has an open source client released on 13 January 2016. GamersGate also sells games for Linux.

In 2015, started OpenXRay project — an improved version of the X-Ray Engine, the game engine used in the world-famous S.T.A.L.K.E.R., with Linux and macOS support.

In July 2015, LinuxGames website shut down.

=== 2017–present ===
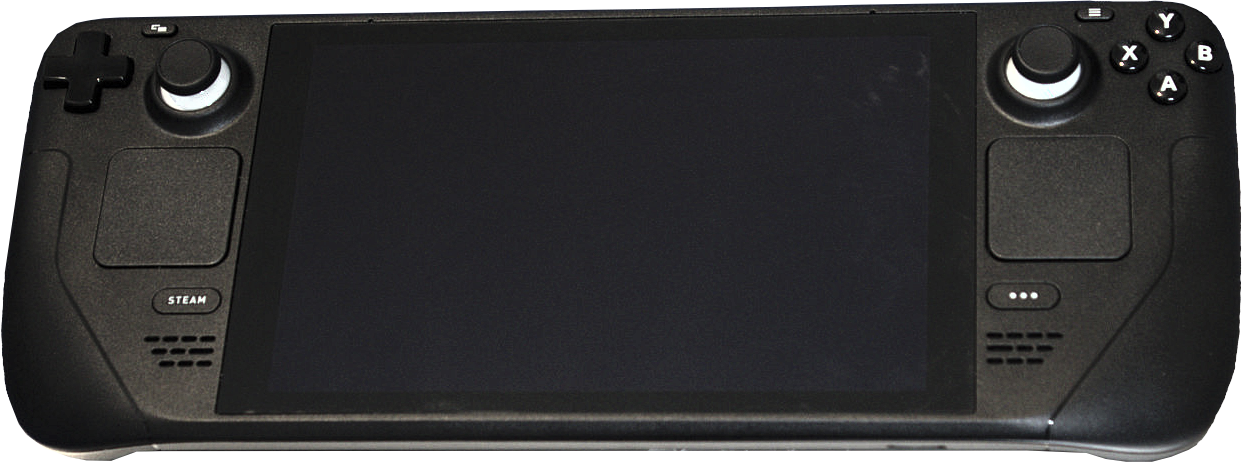
Steam Deck, a handheld game console running a Linux-based operating system

On 22 August 2018, Valve released their fork of Wine called Proton, aimed at gaming. It features some improvements over the vanilla Wine such as Vulkan-based DirectX 11 implementation, Steam integration, better full screen and game controller support and improved performance for multi-threaded games. It has since grown to include support for DirectX 9 and DirectX 12 over Vulkan. The itch.io app added its own Wine integration in June 2020, while Lutris and PlayOnLinux are long-standing independent solutions for compatibility wrappers.

As with Wine and Cedega in the past, concerns have been raised over whether Proton hinders native development more than it encourages use of the platform. Prodeus dropped native support in favour of Proton shortly before final release and Arcen Games cancelled planned native support for Heart of the Machine. Valve has expressed no preference over Proton or native ports among developers.

On 25 February 2022, Valve released Steam Deck, a handheld game console running SteamOS 3.0. The deployment of Proton and other design decisions were based on the limited response to their previous Steam Machines. Linux was also used as a base for several nostalgia consoles, including the Neo Geo X, NES Classic Edition, Super NES Classic Edition, Sega Genesis Mini, Intellivision Amico, Lichee Pocket 4A, and the Atari VCS. It also powers the more general Polymega, Anbernic RG351 and 5G552, as well as the Game Gadget, Evercade, VS, EXP and Super Pocket retrogaming consoles by Blaze Entertainment.

As of early 2023, the retro game store Zoom Platform was enhancing Linux support on their available titles.

== Commercial games for non-x86 instruction sets ==
Sid Meier's Alpha Centauri was released for numerous architectures.

Some companies ported games to Linux running on instruction sets other than x86, such as Alpha, PowerPC, SPARC, MIPS or ARM.

Loki Entertainment Software ported Civilization: Call to Power, Eric's Ultimate Solitaire, Heroes of Might and Magic III, Myth II: Soulblighter, Railroad Tycoon II Gold Edition and Sid Meier's Alpha Centauri with Alien Crossfire expansion pack to Linux PowerPC. They also ported Civilization: Call to Power, Eric's Ultimate Solitaire, Sid Meier's Alpha Centauri with Alien Crossfire expansion pack to Linux Alpha and Civilization: Call to Power, Eric's Ultimate Solitaire to Linux SPARC.

Linux Game Publishing published Candy Cruncher, Majesty Gold, NingPo MahJong and Soul Ride to Linux PowerPC. They also ported Candy Cruncher, Soul Ride to Linux SPARC and Soul Ride to Linux Alpha.

Illwinter Game Design ported Dominions: Priests, Prophets and Pretenders, Dominions II: The Ascension Wars and Dominions 3 to Linux PowerPC, as well as Conquest of Elysium 3, Dominions 4: Thrones of Ascension to Raspberry Pi.

Hyperion Entertainment ported Sin to Linux PowerPC published by Titan Computer and Gorky 17 to Linux PowerPC which later was published by LGP.

Runesoft hired Gunnar von Boehn which ported Robin Hood – The Legend of Sherwood to Linux PowerPC. Later Runesoft ported Airline Tycoon Deluxe to Raspberry Pi was running Debian GNU/Linux.

Laminar Research ported X-Plane 8 to Linux PowerPC.

Iain McLeod ported Spheres of Chaos to Linux on the PlayStation 2 consoles and later re-released it as a freeware game.

== Market share ==
The Steam Hardware Survey reports that as of August 2026, 3.9% of users are using some form of Linux as their platform's main operating system. The Unity game engine used to make their statistics available and in March 2016 reported that Linux users accounted for 0.4% of players. In 2010, in the first Humble Bundle sales, Linux formed 18% of purchases.

== Supported hardware ==
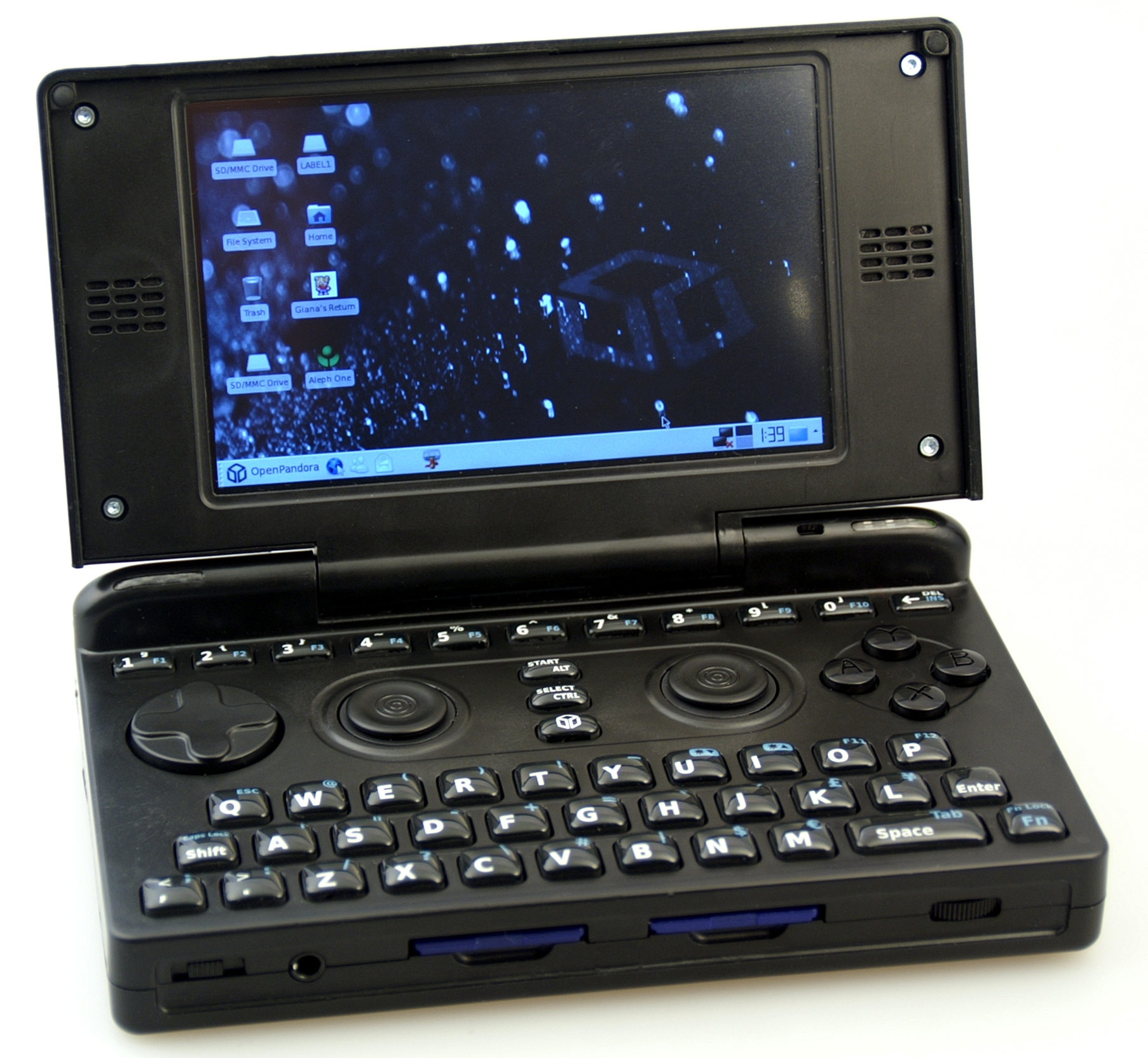
The Pandora was a Linux integrated game console from 2010.

Linux as a gaming platform can also refer to operating systems based on the Linux kernel and specifically designed for the sole purpose of gaming. Examples are SteamOS, which is an operating system for Steam Machines, Steam Deck and general computers, video game consoles built from components found in the classical home computer, (embedded) operating systems like Tizen and Pandora, and handheld game consoles like GP2X, and Neo Geo X. The Nvidia Shield runs Android as an operating system, which is based on a modified Linux kernel.

The open source design of the Linux software platform allows the operating system to be compatible with various computer instruction sets and many peripherals, such as game controllers and head-mounted displays. As an example, HTC Vive, which is a virtual reality head-mounted display, supports the Linux gaming platform.

=== Performance ===
In 2013, tests by Phoronix showed real-world performance of games on Linux with proprietary Nvidia and AMD drivers were mostly comparable to results on Windows 8.1. Phoronix found similar results in 2015, though Ars Technica described a 20% performance drop with Linux drivers.

== Software architecture ==
An operating system based on the Linux kernel and customized specifically for gaming, could adopt the vanilla Linux kernel with only little changes, or—like the Android operating system—be based on a relative extensively modified Linux kernel. It could adopt GNU C Library or Bionic or something like it. The entire middleware or parts of it, could very well be closed-source and proprietary software; the same is true for the video games. There are free and open-source video games available for the Linux operating system, as well as proprietary ones.

=== Linux kernel ===
The subsystems already mainlined and available in the Linux kernel are most probably performant enough so to not impede the gaming experience in any way, however additional software is available, such as e.g. the Brain Fuck Scheduler (a process scheduler) or the Budget Fair Queueing (BFQ) scheduler (an I/O scheduler).

Similar to the way the Linux kernel can be, for example, adapted to run better on supercomputers, there are adaptations targeted at improving the performance of games. A project concerning itself with this issue is called Liquorix.

=== Available software for video game designers ===
==== Game creation systems ====
Several game creation systems can be run on Linux, such as Game Editor, GDevelop, Construct and Stencyl, as well as beta versions of GameMaker. A Linux version of Clickteam Fusion 3 was mentioned, but has yet to be released. The Godot, Defold, and Solar2D game engines also supports creating games on Linux, as do the commercial UnrealEd and Unity Editor, The visual programming environments Snap!, Scratch 1.X and Tynker are Linux compatible. Enterbrain's RPG Maker MV was released for Linux. In addition, open-source, cross-platform clones of the RPG Maker series exist such as Open RPG Maker, MKXP and EasyRPG, as well as the similar OHRRPGCE and Solarus. The Adventure Game Studio editor is not yet ported to Linux, although games made in it are compatible, and the Wintermute and SLUDGE adventure game engines are available. ZGameEditor, Novashell, GB Studio, and the ZZT inspired MegaZeux are also options. Versions of Mugen were made available for Linux, and open-source re-implementations such as IKEMEN Go are compatible. The JavaScript based Ct.js Pixelbox.js, and Superpowers are also options.

==== Level editors ====
Various level editors exist for Linux, such as wxqoole, GtkRadiant, TrenchBroom and J.A.C.K. for the id Tech engines and related, Eureka, SLADE and ReDoomEd for the Doom engine, and the general purpose tile map editors LDtk, Ogmo, and Tiled.

==== Debuggers ====
Several game development tools have been available for Linux, including GNU Debugger, LLDB, Valgrind, glslang and others. VOGL, a debugger for OpenGL was released on 12 March 2014.

==== Available interfaces and SDKs ====
There are multiple interfaces and Software Development Kits available for Linux, and almost all of them are cross-platform. Most are free and open-source software subject to the terms of the zlib License, making it possible to static link against them from fully closed-source proprietary software. One difficulty due to this abundance of interfaces, is the difficulty for programmers to choose the best suitable audio API for their purpose. The main developer of the PulseAudio project, Lennart Poettering, commented on this issue. Physics engines, audio libraries, that are available as modules for game engines, have been available for Linux for a long time.

The book Programming Linux Games covers a couple of the available APIs suited for video game development for Linux, while The Linux Programming Interface covers the Linux kernel interfaces in much greater detail.

Library		License	in	Language bindings		Back-ends				Description
Icon	Name	License	in	Official	3rd-party	Linux	Windows	macOS	Other	Description
Allegro	Allegro	zlib License	C			Yes	Yes	Yes	Android, iOS	
	ClanLib	zlib License	C++	Python, Lua, Ruby		Yes	Yes	—N/a	—N/a	
	GLFW	zlib License	C	—N/a	Ada, C#, Common Lisp, D, Go, Haskell, Java, Python, Rebol, Red, Ruby, Rust	Yes	Yes	Yes		a small C library to create and manage windows with OpenGL contexts, enumerate monitors and video modes, and handle input
	Grapple	LGPL-2.1+	C			Yes	Yes	Yes		free software package for adding multiplayer support
	Nvidia GameWorks	Proprietary	Unknown			WIP	Yes	—N/a	—N/a	As the result of their cooperation with Valve, Nvidia announced a Linux port of GameWorks. As of June 2014, PhysX, and OptiX have been available for Linux for some time.
	OpenPlay	APSL	C			Yes	Yes	Yes	—N/a	networking library authored by Apple Inc.
Pygame	Pygame	LGPL-2.1	Python			Yes	Yes	Yes		build over SDL
	RakNet	BSD 3-clause	C++	C++, C#	—N/a	Yes	Yes	Yes	PlayStation 3, iOS, ...	game network engine for multi-player
SDL	SDL	zlib License	C	C	C#, Pascal, Python, Gambas	EGL, Xlib, GLX?	GDI, Direct3D	Quartz, Core OpenGL?	PSP-stuff	a low-level cross-platform abstraction layer
SFML	SFML	zlib License	C++	C, D, Python, Ruby, OCaml, .Net, Go		Yes	Yes	Yes		
wxWidgets	wxWidgets	LGPL-like	C++			Yes	Yes	Yes		

==== Available middleware ====
Beside majority of the software which acts as an interface to various subsystems of the operating system, there is also software which can be simply described as middleware. A multitude of companies exist worldwide, whose main or only product is software that is meant to be licensed and integrated into a game engine. Their main target is the video game industry, but the film industry also uses such software for special effects. Some very few well known examples are

- classical physics: Havok, Newton Game Dynamics and PhysX
- audio: Audiokinetic Wwise, FMOD
- other: SpeedTree

A significant share of the available middleware already runs natively on Linux, only a very few run exclusively on Linux.

==== Available IDEs and source code editors ====
Numerous source code editors and IDEs are available for Linux, among which are Visual Studio Code, Sublime Text, Code::Blocks, Qt Creator, Emacs, Vim, or GNU nano.

=== Multi-monitor ===
A multi-monitor setup is supported on Linux at least by AMD Eyefinity & AMD Catalyst, Xinerama and RandR on both X11 and Wayland. Serious Sam 3: BFE is one example of a game that runs natively on Linux and supports very high resolutions and is validated by AMD to support their Eyefinity. Civilization V is another example, it even runs on a "Kaveri" desktop APU in 3x1 portrait mode.

=== Voice over IP ===
The specifications of the Mumble protocol are freely available and there are BSD-licensed implementations for both servers and clients. The positional audio API of Mumble is supported by e.g. Cube 2: Sauerbraten.

=== Wine ===
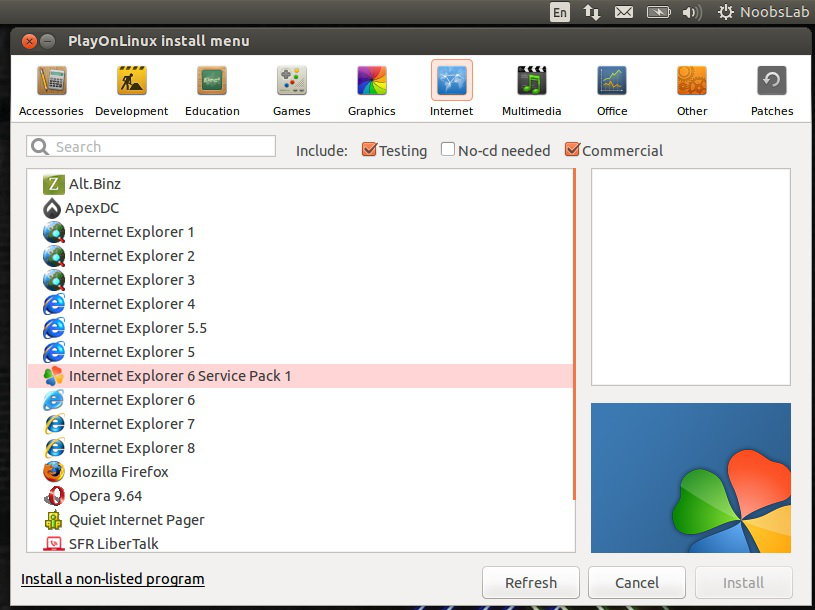
PlayOnLinux helps make Wine gaming accessible.

Wine is a compatibility layer that provides binary compatibility and makes it possible to run software, that was written and compiled for Microsoft Windows, on Linux. The Wine project hosts a user-submitted application database (known as Wine AppDB) that lists programs and games along with ratings and reviews which detail how well they run with Wine. Wine AppDB also has a commenting system, which often includes instructions on how to modify a system to run a certain game which cannot run on a normal or default configuration. Many games are rated as running flawlessly, and there are also many other games that can be run with varying degrees of success. The use of Wine for gaming has proved controversial in the Linux community as some feel it is preventing, or at least hindering, the further growth of native gaming on the platform.

=== Emulators ===
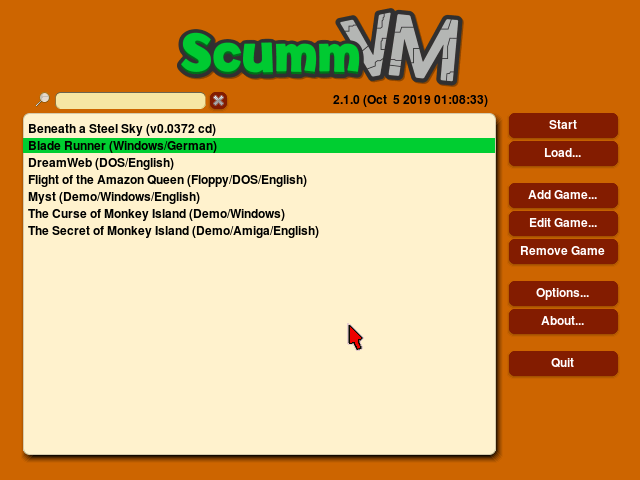
ScummVM has enabled numerous games to be run on Linux both commercially and by hobbyists.

There are numerous emulators for Linux. There are also APIs, virtual machines, and machine emulators that provide binary compatibility:

- Anbox and Waydroid for the Android operating system;
- Basilisk II for the 68040 Mac;
- DOSBox and DOSEMU for MS-DOS and compatibles;
- DeSmuME and melonDS for the Nintendo DS;
- Dolphin for the GameCube, Wii, and the Triforce;
- FCEUX, Nestopia and TuxNES for the Nintendo Entertainment System;
- Flashpoint for Adobe Flash;
- Frotz for Z-Machine text adventures;
- Fuse for the Sinclair ZX Spectrum;
- Hatari for the Atari ST, STe, TT and Falcon;
- gnuboy for the Nintendo Game Boy and Game Boy Color;
- MAME for arcade games (and previously MESS for multiple hardware platforms);
- Mednafen and Xe emulating multiple hardware platforms including some of the above;
- Mupen64Plus and the no longer actively developed original Mupen64 for the Nintendo 64;
- PCSX-Reloaded, pSX and the Linux port of ePSXe for the PlayStation;
- Neko Project for the NEC PC-9801;
- PCSX2 for the PlayStation 2;
- PPSSPP for the PlayStation Portable;
- ScummVM for LucasArts and various other adventure games;
- SheepShaver for the PowerPC Macintosh;
- Snes9x, higan and ZSNES for the Super NES;
- Stella for the Atari 2600;
- UAE for the Amiga;
- VICE for the Commodore 64, 128, VIC-20, Plus/4 and PET;
- VisualBoyAdvance, mGBA and Boycott Advance for the Game Boy Advance;
- Mini vMac and the no longer actively developed original vMac for the 680x0 Macintosh;

=== Linux homebrew on consoles ===
Linux has been ported to several game consoles, including the Xbox, PlayStation 2, PlayStation 3, PlayStation 4, GameCube, and Wii which allows game developers without an expensive game development kit to access console hardware. Several gaming peripherals also work with Linux.

== Types of Linux gaming ==
Linux gaming can be divided into a number of sub-categories.

=== Libre gaming ===
Libre gaming is a form of Linux gaming that emphasizes libre software, which often includes levels and assets as well as code.

=== Native gaming ===
Native gaming is a form of Linux gaming that emphasizes using only native games or ports and not using emulators or compatibility layers.

=== DRM-free gaming ===
DRM-free gaming is a form of Linux gaming that emphasizes boycotting DRM technologies. This can include buying games from GOG.com, certain Humble Bundles or itch.io and avoiding Steam and similar services.

=== Terminal gaming ===
Terminal gaming is the playing of text-based games from within a console, often programmed within Bash or using libraries such as ncurses.

=== Retro gaming ===
Retrogaming is the playing of older games using emulators such as MAME or Dosbox, compatibility layers such as Wine and Proton, engine reimplementations and source ports, or even older Linux distributions (including live CDs and live USB, or virtual machines), original binaries, and period hardware.

=== Live gaming ===
A number of games can be played from live distributions such as Knoppix, allowing easy access for users unwilling to fully commit to Linux. Certain live distros have specially targeted gamers, such as SuperGamer and Linux-Gamers.

=== Browser gaming ===
Browser gaming is the act of playing online games through a web browser, which has the advantage of largely being platform independent. The same largely applies to social network games hosted on social media sites. Older games were largely based on Adobe Flash, while modern ones are mostly HTML5, such as Ancient Beast.

=== Cloud gaming ===
Cloud gaming is the streaming of games from a central server onto a desktop client. This is another way to play games on Linux that are not natively supported, although some cloud services, such as the erstwhile Google Stadia, are hosted on Linux and Android servers. GamingAnywhere is an open source implementation.

=== On Windows ===
Although less exploited than the reverse, as few programs are Linux exclusive, support does exist for running Linux binaries from Windows. The Windows Subsystem for Linux allows the running of both command line and graphical Linux applications from Windows 10 and Windows 11. An earlier implementation is Cygwin, started by Cygnus Solutions and later maintained by Red Hat, although it has limited hardware access and required adaptation. The use of Wine can even allow for the running of Windows games on Linux from Windows. The LibTAS library for tool assisted speedruns currently recommends WSL to run on Windows. Naughty Dog meanwhile have used Cygwin to run old command-line tools for use in their game development, which is a broader use for the platform. As with running Windows applications on Linux, there is controversy over whether running Linux applications on Windows will dilute interest in Linux as distinct platform, though it has speciality uses.

=== Android gaming ===
Originally derived from Linux, the Android mobile operating system has a distinct and popular gaming ecosystem. It has also been used as the base for several game consoles, such as the Nvidia Shield Portable and the Ouya. Popular games include Pokémon Go, Genshin Impact, League of Legends: Wild Rift, Dead Cells and Call of Duty: Mobile. Certain games, such as Minecraft, Stardew Valley, and Papers Please, are available for both Android and desktop Linux.

=== ChromeOS gaming ===
ChromeOS is another Linux derived operating system by Google for its Chromebooks, and it too has a dedicated gaming ecosystem. Partly owing to a lack of high end graphics hardware, it is especially oriented towards cloud gaming via services like GeForce Now and Xbox Cloud Gaming, with models featuring Nvidia GPUs ultimately being cancelled. Numerous games for Android have also been made compatible with ChromeOS, as well as a standard Linux games, Windows games via Wine or Proton, and with browser games also being popular. A version of Steam has been in development for ChromeOS, with third party launchers also available such as the Heroic Games Launcher for the Epic Games Store. Popular titles include Among Us, Genshin Impact, Alto's Odyssey, Roblox, and Fortnite. Skepticism remains for using ChromeOS and Chromebooks as gaming machines. In August 2025, Google announced that they will end Steam for Chromebook support in 2026.

=== BSD gaming ===
Owing to a common Unix-like heritage and free software ethos, many games for Linux are also ported to Berkeley Software Distribution (BSD) variants or can be run using compatibility layers such as Linuxulator. BSDi had partnered with Loki Software to ensure its Linux ports ran on FreeBSD. The Mizutamari launcher exists to facilitate running Windows games through Wine, which can still be used standalone. A 2011 benchmark by Phoronix even found certain speed advantages over running games on Linux alone, comparing PC-BSD 8.2 to Ubuntu 11.04. Most BSD systems come with the same pack in desktop games as Linux. The permissive licensing of BSD has also lead to its inclusion in the system software of several game consoles, such as the Sony PlayStation line and the Nintendo Switch.

=== OpenHarmony gaming ===
HarmonyOS with custom kernel and OpenHarmony-Oniro based operating systems distros of these newer platforms has a dedicated gaming ecosystem with compatibilities with third-party Linux libraries by developers on Linux kernel subsystem such as musl-libc of C standard library that targets the Linux syscall and POSIX APIs compatibility for native compatible games as well as limited virtual machines such as Android-based sandboxed ones.

=== Unix gaming ===
A further niche exists for running games, either through ports or lxrun, on Solaris and derivatives such as OpenIndiana, Darwin distributions such as PureDarwin, Coherent, SerenityOS, RedoxOS, ToaruOS, Xv6, Fiwix, or on Minix and Hurd based systems. There has been some cross-pollination with purely proprietary Unix derivatives, such as AIX, QNX, Domain/OS, HP-UX, IRIX (see here), Xenix, SCO Unix, Unixware, Tru64 UNIX, LynxOS (which features inbuilt Linux compatibility), Ultrix, OpenVMS, z/OS UNIX System Services, and even A/UX. The games Doom and Quake were developed by id Software on NeXTStep, a forerunner of modern macOS, before being ported to DOS and back to numerous other Unix variants. This involved reaching out to numerous Unix vendors to supply machines to use in the build and testing process.

== Fandom ==
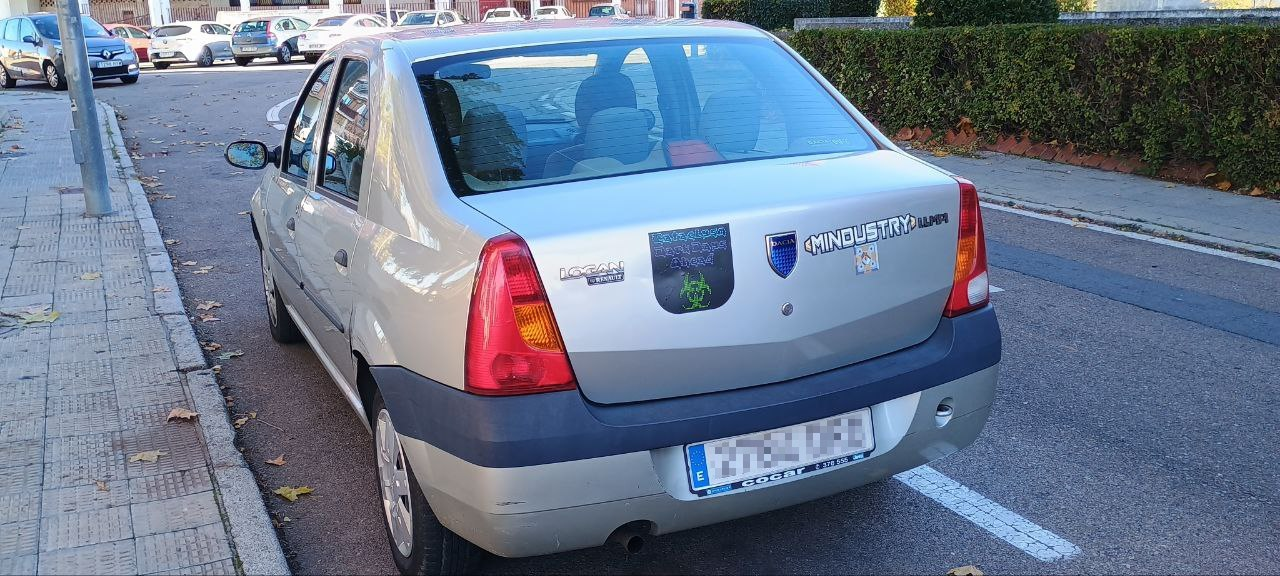
A fan in Spain who has put vinyl stickers from his free games Cataclysm: Dark Days Ahead and Mindustry on his car

The community surrounding Linux and free/open source video games is very small, almost all medium-sized or mature free video games have a forum or other means of communication.

However, in recent years, there have been no meetups for any of the games, although free video games have been present at free software community events, including FOSDEM, where the video game Luanti usually has its own stand. There have also been online events such as onfoss.

On the other hand, many projects use the sale of merchandise with logos and other images from the video game on T-shirts and other products as one of their sources of funding.

== See also ==
- Directories and lists
  - Free Software Directory
  - List of emulators
  - List of open-source video games
  - List of video game console emulators
- Linux gaming software
  - Direct3D (alternative implementation)
  - Lutris
  - PlayOnLinux
  - Proton (software)
  - Steam (service)
  - Vulkan
  - Wine (software)
- Other articles
  - Linux for PlayStation 2
  - Sega Lindbergh
