= Hopkins FBI =

1998 video game

- Developer: MP Entertainment
- Publishers: PolyEx Software; Cryo Interactive
- Platforms: BeOS, Linux, OS/2 Warp, Windows
- Release: July 16, 1998
- Genre: Adventure game
- Mode: Single-player

Hopkins FBI is a 1998 point-and-click adventure game from MP Entertainment, most famous for very large (at the time) amounts of gore. A sequel titled Hopkins FBI 2: Don't Cry, Baby, involving Hopkins having to rescue the President's daughter, was announced but never released.

== Plot ==
Players assume the role of FBI agent Hopkins, who is on the trail of a criminal mastermind named Bernie Berckson. The pursuit takes the player through a variety of locations, including the FBI headquarters in a modern fictional city, a tropical island, and a submarine base.

== Development and release ==
The game's highly stylized artwork was created by cartoonists, among them French artist Thierry Ségur. The artists drew each scene frame by frame, then they were scanned into the computer and retouched to produce the finished scenes. Quandary felt that the game was specifically designed for the male teen/pre-teen demographic due to being populated by "available/naked women and mostly bloody, grotesque men".

The soundtrack of the game included licensed songs from the 60's rock band The Troggs ("I Can't Control Myself" and "Lost Girl"), Blue Magoos ("Tobacco Road"), Rare Earth ("Feelin' Alright") and an original game score. The game features a short first-person shooter segment reminiscent of Wolfenstein 3D.

Hopkins FBI was originally released on July 16, 1998. PolyEx Software, Inc. released it for BeOS and OS/2 Warp. The OS/2 beta release was in French. The small OS/2 market share necessitated cross platform development. Ports to Mac OS and Rhapsody were planned but never released. The game is known to be one of the first commercial games to be available for Linux, alongside the ports of Doom, Quake and Quake II by id Software, Abuse by Crack dot com, Inner Worlds, and Loki Software's first port, Civilization: Call to Power, which was released in 1999. The Spanish version was distributed by Friendware, the French version by Cryo Interactive, and the Polish version by CD Projekt. Just Adventure described it as a "very strange" little game from England that was virtually unknown in North America.

== Reception ==
PC Gamer panned the game as "cack-handed", "misogynistic", and "mean-spirited". Adventure Gamers thought it was a twisted game that would be a guilty pleasure for some players. Adventure-archiv disliked the small amount of game saves, and the clumsy inventory system. Adventure-Treff thought the player would be frustrated by illogical puzzles and dead ends. Classic Adventure Games deemed it "a true British game".
