= Perihelion (disambiguation) =

Perihelion is the point of closest approach to the Sun of a body orbiting the Sun.

Perihelion may also refer to:

- Perihelion: The Prophecy, a 1993 role-playing video game for the Amiga computer
- Perihelion Software, a British software company
- Isaac Asimov's Robot City: Perihelion, a 1988 novel by William F. Wu
- Perihelion, a short story by Dan Abnett for the Warhammer 40,000 universe
- Perihelion, a song by King Gizzard & the Lizard Wizard from Infest the Rats' Nest (2019)
