= Dominions 4: Thrones of Ascension =

2013 fantasy turn-based strategy video game

- Developer(s): Illwinter
- Publisher(s): Illwinter
- Series: Dominions
- Platform(s): Linux; macOS; Microsoft Windows
- Release: October 10, 2013
- Genre(s): Fantasy turn-based strategy
- Mode(s): Single-player, multiplayer

Dominions 4: Thrones of Ascension is a fantasy turn-based strategy game created and published by Illwinter in 2013. It is the fourth game in the Dominions series, preceded by Dominions: Priests, Prophets and Pretenders, Dominions II: The Ascension Wars and Dominions 3: The Awakening and succeeded by Dominions 5: Warriors of the Faith released in 2017. Dominions 4 was initially released in Desura and later at GamersGate. It went through the Greenlight process and was released on Steam in September 2013, which became the most popular platform for looking for multiplayer games and discussions after Desura shut down. Some active communities can also be found on Discord and 4chan.

The game, like its predecessor, combines a simple presentation with an extremely wide array of strategic options, including over 75 nations, 2000 units, 600 spells and 300 magic items. Turns are resolved simultaneously, with players planning battles rather than directly controlling them.

The game includes scenarios and randomized play, but does not include a campaign. Dominions 4 is mainly designed for multiplayer, including PBEM, hotseat and TCP/IP. AI opponents are available for single-player. The game is very suitable for roleplay, both in singleplayer and multiplayer.

Compared to the previous game several additions and changes have been made, the most prominent being the addition of the eponymous Thrones of Ascension which is a new game mode where victory is achieved by capturing Thrones of Ascension. Furthermore, a new team-based mode has been added. Other changes and additions include several new playable nations, changes to some of the sprites, maps and interface, several balance changes, new units, spells and items, improved AI, random events, an improved map generator, as well as increased moddability.

== Gameplay ==
Dominions 4 is a turn-based strategy game in which nations and armies are pawns in the service of pretenders, avatars on the verge of godhood, who clash with one another as they strive to be the last deity standing and become the all-powerful Pantokrator.

=== Combat ===
There are hundreds of different units to recruit within the game, including archers, infantry, cavalry and mages. Troops can be recruited in all provinces and which types are often influenced by the terrain. For example, woodsmen and druids can be found in forest provinces, while aquatic fish-men can be found on coasts. In order to recruit nation-specific troops, the player has to construct a fortress in most cases, some units are restricted to the player capital province and powerful commanders and units take two turns to recruit. Mages require a laboratory to recruit, whilst priests need a temple.

The battle results are calculated by the computer and can be viewed by the players at the beginning of the next turn, like a film, or the battle may be instantly calculated and a summary displayed to the player bearing the relevant numbers. The battles cannot be influenced once the calculations begin for the new turn, but players can set simple orders for their troops before the battle is calculated, assign formations to different squads, influence the units starting positions in the battlefield, allowing for diverse tactics.

=== Magic ===
There are eight paths of magic in the game: fire, water, air, earth, astral, death, nature and blood. Mages in Dominions 4 have one or more paths, with nations having distinct mages and therefore a different magical emphasis. Many spells or items require two paths to cast or forge, respectively, but none require more than two.

=== Nations ===
The nations in the game are based upon world history and mythology, rather than standard high fantasy races such as elves and orcs. Amongst others, the mythologies of ancient Greece (Arcoscephale), the Roman Republic (Ermor), Byzantium (Pythium), Sarmatians (Sauromatia), Egypt (C'tis), Medieval France & Spain (Marignon), Medieval England (Man), Ireland (Fomoria, Eriu, Tir na n'Og), Scandinavia (Vanheim, Helheim, Jotunheim, Midgard, Utgard, Nieflheim), Germany (Ulm), China (Tien Chi), Zimbabwe (Machaka), Japan (Jomon), Aztecs (Mictlan), Rus' (Bogarus), and India (Kailasa, Lanka, Bandar Log, Patala) are represented. Other nations are based on the work of recent writers, particularly H. P. Lovecraft (R'lyeh and Atlantis), or Abysia, that looks loosely based on Yezidi faith, as it contains Melek Taus in its list of random general names and is mostly associated with holy flames, beings of flame, fire worship and magma, or Hinnom, which is based on Semitic mythology, featuring Nephilim. Some of the new nations included in Dominions 4 are Nazca, a nations of bird humanoids and mummies based on the Nazca civilization mixed with other cultures from ancient Peru, Ur, a nation of beastlike humanoids based on the civilization of Uruk and the Epic of Gilgamesh, Ys, a sunken city inspired by the eponymous Breton myth and led by Morgen, among others.
