= Nobara (operating system) =

Linux distribution

Nobara Linux
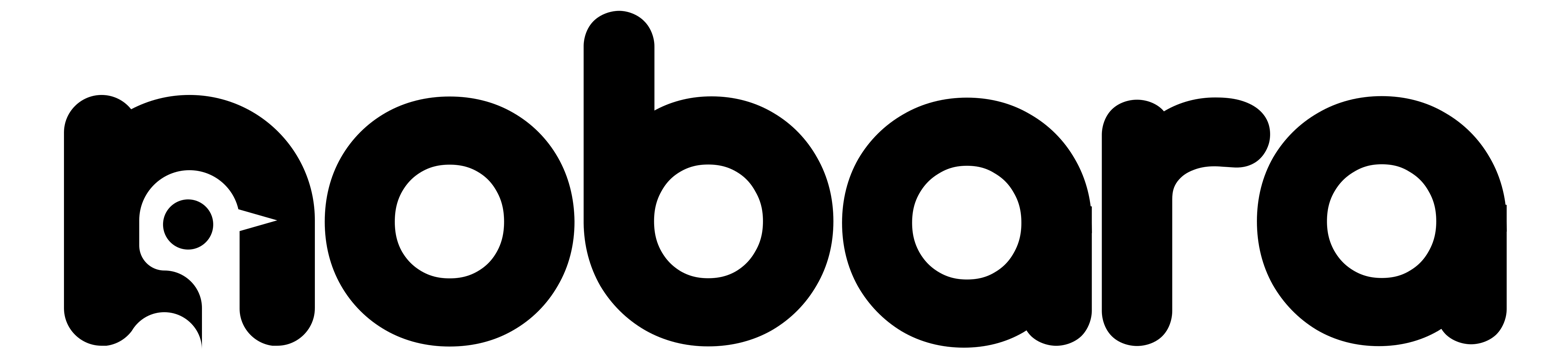

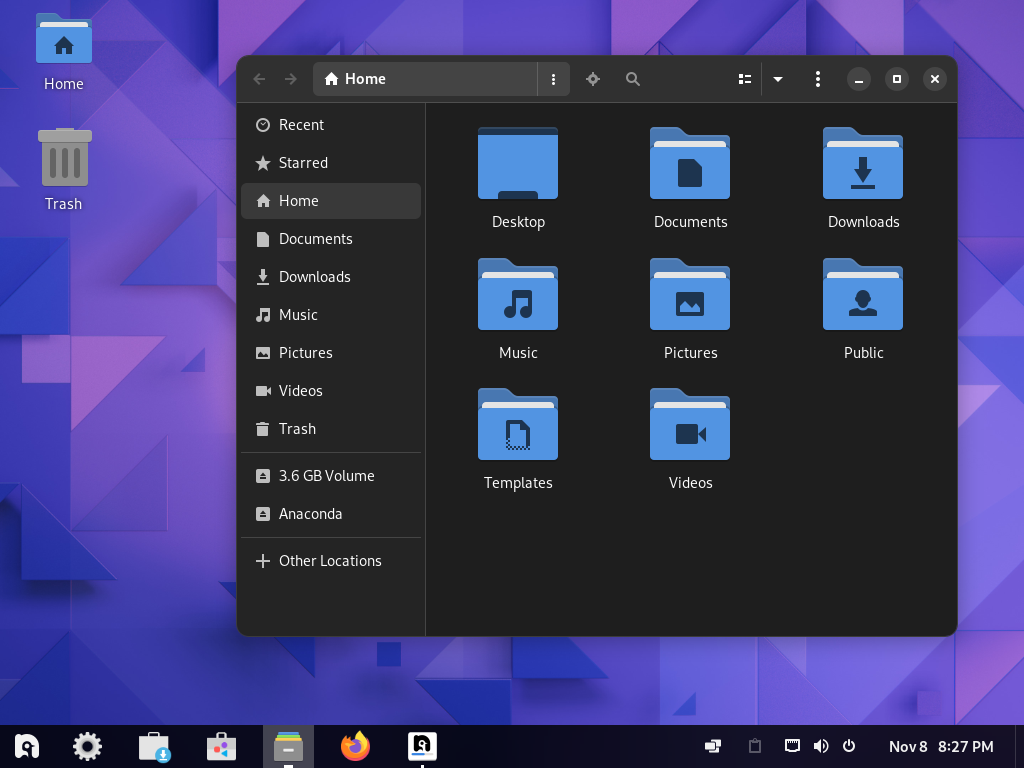
- Screenshot of Nobara with GNOME Shell
- Developer: Thomas Crider, Community-driven
- OS family: Linux (Unix-like)
- Working state: Current
- Source model: Open source
- Initial release: July 10, 2022; 4 years ago
- Latest release: 44 / 28 August 2026; 2 months ago
- Repository: github.com/Nobara-Project/nobara-images
- Package manager: RPM (DNF), Flatpak, OSTree
- Supported platforms: Primary: x86-64, armhf, aarch64; Alternative: mips64el, mipsel, ppc64le, RISC-V, s390x
- Kernel type: Monolithic (Linux kernel)
- Userland: GNU
- Default user interface: GNOME Shell, KDE Plasma 6, Bash
- License: Various free software licenses, plus proprietary firmware files
- Official website: nobaraproject.org

Nobara Linux is a Linux distribution based on Fedora Linux. It is developed by Thomas Crider, known pseudonymously as "Glorious Eggroll", who is also known for developing Proton-GE, a modification of Valve Corporation's compatibility layer, widely used for running Windows games on Linux.

== History ==
Nobara Linux was first released on July 10, 2022. It was developed and maintained by Thomas Crider, previously employed as a software maintenance engineer at Red Hat, working in Denver, Colorado, United States. According to Crider in a YouTube interview, the idea for Nobara Linux originated from his efforts to fix the gaming issues his father encountered on Windows. Frustrated with the recurring problems and attempts to resolve them manually, Crider decided to create a Linux-based environment preconfigured for gaming, including compatibility lists and automated setups, leading to the development of Nobara Linux.

On May 13, 2025, version 42 was released and version 41 received these updates as rolling release updates making Nobara Linux officially a rolling release distribution. Brave replaced Firefox as the default browser.

The latest version, 44, was released on August 28, 2026, continuing the rolling release model and providing ISO images for all main editions (Official, GNOME, KDE, Steam-HTPC, Steam-Handheld). On October 13, 2026, the ISO downloads for Nobara Linux were reworked, merging the nVidia specific images with the main images. Now, instead of nVidia specific images, users can select an option to install the nVidia drivers when installing the operating system. This release still maintains version 44.

== Features ==
Nobara Linux aims to provide users who are less technologically skilled with commonly used packages, due to the original Fedora Linux missing 3rd party and/or proprietary packages and tools, as stated on the official website: "anything involving any kind of 3rd party or proprietary packages is usually absent from a fresh install."

Nobara developers assert that "point and click users" who rely heavily on graphical user interface installation processes and activities may struggle with such tasks. Packages commonly used by gamers or in gaming-related activities are installed by default. These include:

- Steam and Lutris for game management
- WINE and Proton-GE for running Windows games
- OBS Studio, Blender, Kdenlive for content creation
- Third-party codecs (GStreamer, H.264, H.265)
- Proprietary drivers (NVIDIA, AMD) preinstalled
- Enabled RPMFusion Free & Nonfree, Flatpak / Flathub repositories

Utilities include:

- Nobara Tweak Tool for system adjustments
- Post-Installation Wizard for easy setup
- Performance optimizations (kernel tweaks, Mesa/Vulkan drivers)
- Hardware compatibility fixes (Wi-Fi, Bluetooth, graphics drivers)

The distribution provides five desktop editions: Official (custom KDE), GNOME, KDE, Steam-HTPC, and Steam-Handheld.

== Installation ==
The official Nobara Linux site supplies ISO images that can be run using a bootable USB device. The site recommends using Ventoy to create a bootable USB device.

Secure boot must be disabled in UEFI on the computer, as Nobara does not support it.
