= Proton (software) =

Linux compatibility layer for Windows games

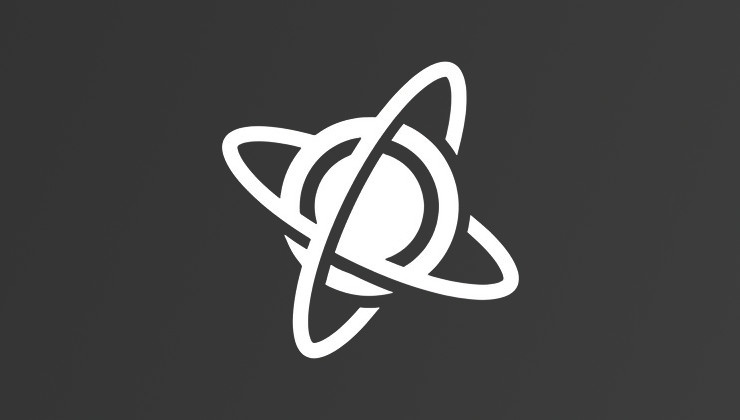

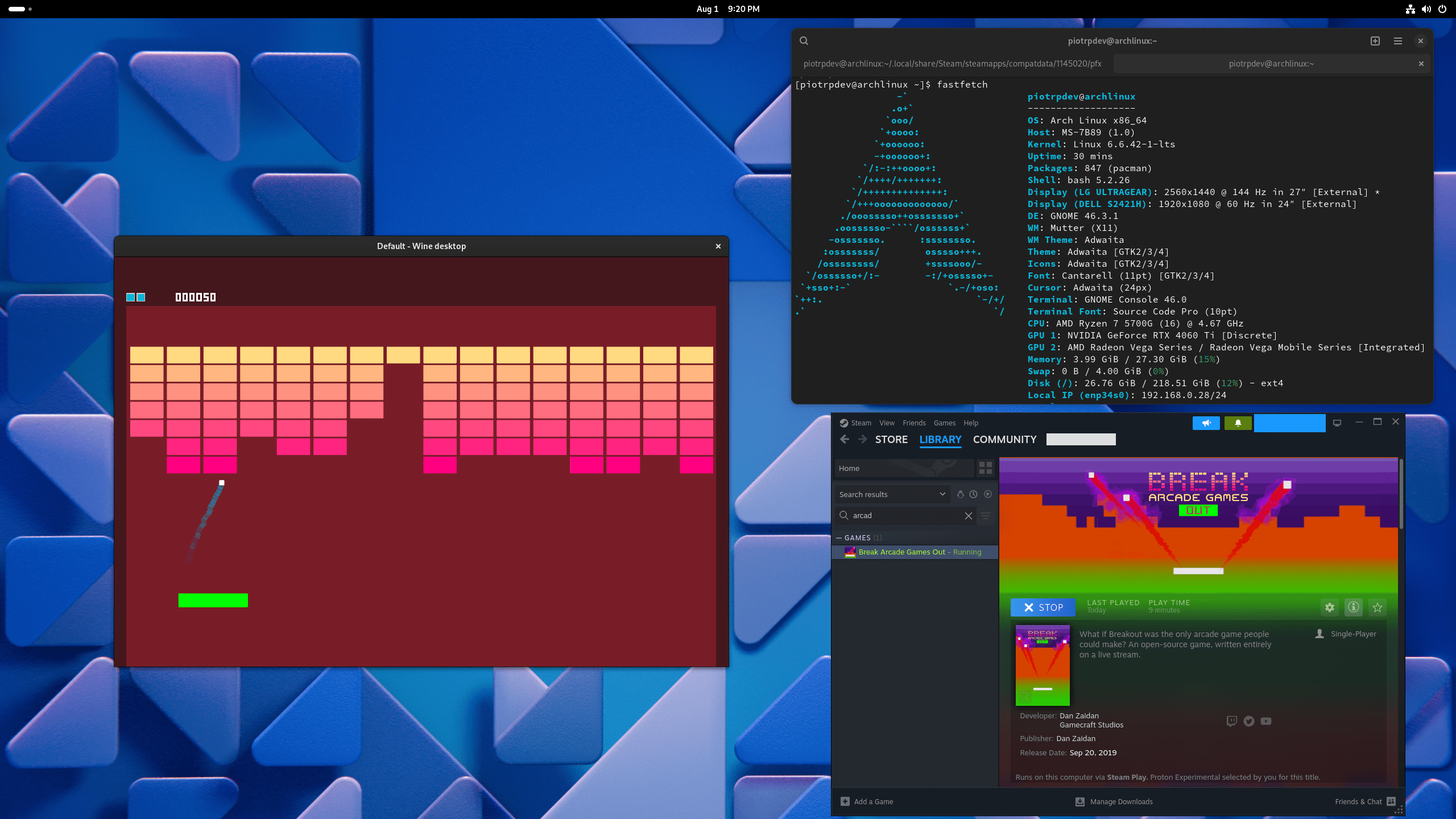
- Break Arcade Games Out running on Arch Linux using Proton Experimental
- Developers: Valve; CodeWeavers
- Release: 21 August 2018; 8 years ago
- Stable release: 11.0-2 / 21 August 2026; 57 days ago
- Operating system: Linux
- Available in: English
- Type: Compatibility layer
- License: General: 3-clause BSD; Wine: LGPLv2.1+; DXVK (and D9VK in older versions): zlib; Steam API library: Proprietary
- Repository: Proton on GitHub

Proton is a compatibility layer that allows Windows software (primarily video games) to run on Linux-based operating systems. Proton is developed by Valve in cooperation with developers from CodeWeavers. It is a collection of software and libraries combined with a patched version of Wine to improve performance and compatibility with Windows games. Proton is designed for integration into the Steam client as "Steam Play". It is officially distributed through the client, although third-party forks can be manually installed.

== Overview ==
Proton was initially released on 21 August 2018. Upon release, Valve announced a list of 27 games that were tested and certified to perform like their native Windows counterparts without requiring end-user tweaking. These include Doom (2016), Quake, and Final Fantasy VI.

Proton incorporates several libraries that improve 3D performance. These include Direct3D-to-Vulkan translation layers, namely DXVK for Direct3D 8, 9, 10 and 11, and VKD3D-Proton for Direct3D 12. A separate library known as D9VK handled Direct3D 9 support until it was merged into DXVK in December 2019.

== Compatibility ==
Proton generally has better compatibility with Windows games than upstream Wine due to additional patches and components intended specifically for gaming. These include synchronization technologies such as esync and fsync, as well as components such as VKD3D-Proton for translating Direct3D 12 to Vulkan.

Proton also incorporates DXVK, which translates Direct3D 8, 9, 10 and 11 calls to Vulkan. These components, together with Proton's modifications to Wine and its integration with Steam, are intended to improve the performance and compatibility of Windows games on Linux.

Many Windows games beyond those officially tested or verified by Valve can work with Proton. Community-maintained compatibility databases such as ProtonDB collect user reports describing how individual games perform with Proton and which configurations or Proton versions may be required.

Compatibility varies between games and Proton versions. Games may depend on Windows-specific functionality, graphics APIs, digital rights management, or anti-cheat and anti-tamper systems that can affect their operation under Proton. Valve's Proton changelog documents compatibility fixes and improvements for individual games across different releases. Anti-cheat systems are a significant compatibility obstacle due to many multiplayer games requiring Windows specific kernel-level anti-cheat systems that Proton cannot replicate. Some anti-cheat systems, such as Easy Anti-Cheat and BattlEye, have runtimes for Proton but require developers to opt in.

Users can select Proton as a compatibility tool for individual games through Steam. Proton may also be used for games that have native Linux versions, allowing users to run the Windows version when they prefer it or when the native version has compatibility or performance problems.

=== ProtonDB ===
ProtonDB is an unofficial community website that collects and displays crowdsourced data describing the compatibility of a given title with Proton, on a rating scale from "Borked" (doesn't work) to "Platinum" (works perfectly). The site is inspired by the WineHQ AppDB, which also collects and displays crowdsourced compatibility reports and uses a similar rating system.

=== GE-Proton ===
GE-Proton (also known as Proton-GE) is a community-maintained custom build of Proton developed by Thomas Crider, known online as GloriusEggroll. It incorporates additional patches and components intended to improve compatibility with some Windows games on Linux and is not affiliated with Valve.

GE-Proton includes additional Wine and Wine Staging patches, media foundation patches, support for Nvidia's CUDA and NVAPI, raw input support, and the protonfixes system for applying game-specific compatibility fixes. It has also been integrated into third-party Linux gaming software, including Lutris. Phoronix has described GloriousEggroll as the developer of Proton-GE in its coverage of the Nobara Linux distribution.

== Performance compared to Windows ==
Native Windows games can reach near equal, or occasionally better, performance running under Proton as compared to running on Windows. Performance can vary depending on the game, user settings, the user's choice of Linux distribution and hardware. AMD graphics cards can yield better results due to the open source AMDgpu drivers built into the Linux kernel, while Nvidia cards may require manual installation of proprietary drivers. Some tests using Nvidia graphics cards have shown a more severe performance hit when running Windows games under Proton.

== Release history ==
Valve has released ten major versions of Proton. The versioning scheme refers to the upstream Wine version it is based on, with an appended patch number. Proton generally lags behind its upstream Wine base by several releases. Unofficial forks, such as Proton GE, have been created to rebase Proton on recent Wine versions, which may improve or worsen compatibility with games compared to the official release. In December 2020, Valve released Proton Experimental, a perpetual beta branch of Proton that incorporates new features and bug fixes quicker than regular releases, which are eventually included in a regular release.

The Steam Deck uses Proton to increase software title compatibility.

== Major Software Versions ==
Version	Release date	Details
3.7	August 2018	First official release. Integrated DXVK for Direct3D 10/11 via Vulkan. 27 supported games
4.2	April 2019	Updated to a newer version of Wine. Features enhanced support for fullscreen mode and controllers
5.0	February 2020	Based on Wine 5.0. Added support for some games with anti-cheat systems.
5.13	October 2020	Added enhanced media playback and networking features
6.3	April 2021	Based on Wine 6.0. Improved Direct3D 12 support via VKD3D-Proton
7.0	February 2022	Based on Wine 7.0
8.0	April 2023	
9.0	May 2024	Improved support for newer games and technologies
10.0	November 2025	Updated DXVK, VKD3D, and Wine. Unlike Wine 10, it does not provide a method to access the native Wayland driver.
11.0		Based on Wine 11. Added support for new games and added FEX-Emu support for ARM computers.

== See also ==
- SteamOS
- Lutris
- CrossOver
- Video games and Linux
- Steam (service)
