= Theocracy (video game) =

2000 video game

- Cover art
- Developer: Philos Laboratories
- Publisher: Ubi Soft
- Designers: Laszlo Tili, John (Zsolt) Vamosi
- Platforms: Microsoft Windows, Linux
- Release: UK: March 24, 2000
- Genre: Real-time strategy
- Modes: Single-player, multiplayer

Theocracy is a real-time strategy game for the PC developed by Philos Laboratories and published by Ubi Soft in 2000. The game takes place in Mexico and Central America in the 15th century. The player controls a tribe in this region, and has 100 years to prepare for a Spanish invasion by expanding their territory across the Central American map, by conquest, or by allying and trading with other tribes.

== Story ==
In Theocracy, the player is the leader of the Atlan tribe (a fictional tribe), who has escaped from oppression under the Axocopans, and now must improve their tribe in order to survive in Central America. As the player's empire's borders expands, the player is able to conduct diplomacy with other tribes.

The game also allows players to play through several "Chronicles", a set of objective-based missions detailing supposed heroes of Aztec history. These mostly serve for tutorial purposes rather than being a serious part of the game however.

== Gameplay ==
There are two modes of playing: province view, and realm view. In province view, the player view a particular province under their control/attack. Here they assign tasks to their persons, however time stands still here, and the player must go to realm view for time to move and their actions to take effect. There is a time-scale in realm view, along with a hand-drawn map of Central America, showing all the province borders, and using colour-code to show which of the eight factions controls it. The player's tribe is represented by the colour blue, while other tribes are red, yellow, green, purple and cobalt. Provinces under control from a random tribe with no possible relations to others are paper-coloured, and provinces controlled by the Spanish (once the Spanish arrive to invade) are grey. Each tribe has a unique 'personality' dictated by its AI; the red tribe the Izhuacans for example are an 'aggressive and warlike theocracy' and will generally be the first tribe to make an aggressive move in the game. The green tribe, the Huaputecs, are more peaceful and will never attack the player unless the player has already initiated hostilities. Tribes also have varying military tactics and units, the Yellow Yaxuna Tribe has an army consisting of almost entirely sword units supported by spearmen, jaguars and nature priests, while the Cyan tribe, the Teotitlans, have enormous crossbow units known as Wonderbows and soul priests supporting their warriors.

Players can also build Aztec-style pyramids to harness the power of magic from the five spheres of Magic: Sun, Star, Moon, Nature and Soul. The amount of magic available to the player is limited and measured in "Mana", Mana is used by Priests to cast spells, this Mana can be recharged by performing sacrifices at the Pyramids where priests are trained, the amount of Mana per unit depends on the Unit type. Each sphere of magic has different spells available with a vague focus on a specific type. Sun Priests specialise in attack spells, Moon in defensive ones, Nature Priests in Healing, Star Priests in 'debuff' or distraction and while Soul Priests are equally skilled in all fields.

The time scale can be used to determine how fast time passes. It can be paused to make time stand still, and at slowest rate, a year passes in approximately 10 or so minutes, and at fastest rate, a year passes in approximately 20 seconds.

== Province View ==
Theocracy in Province View mode

Each region can be closely managed in the province view. Here activities can be undertaken such as construction, training and allocation of slaves.

The majority of the population of each realm is made up of slaves, basic worker units who can undertake any task except fight and transport resources between realms. There are a certain number of new slaves born each year depending on the level of health in the province, how much food the province has and what the current population of the province is.

=== Food ===
As a bare minimum, each province must produce enough food to feed the entire population of the realm. There are two types of food, corn and meat. Corn is produced from small and large farms, and is produced faster and in greater quantity than meat, and is also required to feed llamas. Meat, while taking longer to produce, requires less slaves and is more nutritious than corn, meaning it can feed more people than the same amount of corn. It is therefore more economic to produce meat in a province than corn. Meat is also required to feed tamed jaguars.

=== Resources and storage ===
There are a number of different resources that can be used in different ways. The most basic are meat and corn, used to feed people and tamed animals. Next is wood, which every building uses in construction, and is also used to create Wonderbows (similar to ballistas). Also used in construction is stone, which is used to build more advanced buildings. Finally, there is Gold, Jade, and Jewels. Jewels are used as a currency, and to decorate the most advanced buildings. It is made out of Jade and Gold. Either one can be used to create jewels separately, but used together they produce a much greater quantity than when used separately. Corn is produced from small and large farms, meat from ranches (pig farms) and fishing huts. Wood is produced from lumberyards and stone, gold and jade are mined from quarries. Jewels are produced in a workshop from gold and/or jade. There is also mana, however it functions differently from the other resources in that it is used to cast spells, can be accessed anywhere, and is generated from temples in a small continuous trickle. Sacrificing slaves will generate much more and faster, but slaves are the only means of production so they must be sacrificed carefully so as not to ruin the economy of a region. There is a different stockpile of mana for each sphere of magic. Note: resources are stored in stockpiles in each region, thus resources for one realm can be used anywhere in that region no matter where they are stored, but must be manually transported to another region in order to be used there. The exceptions are jewels and mana.

== Buildings ==
Theocracy showing an Aztec town

There are a number of different buildings, which can all be broadly categorised into three main types:

=== Production Buildings ===
These buildings produce resources, but must be staffed to do so. These include ranches and fishing huts, which produce meat, small and large farms, which produce corn, quarries and mines which produce stone, gold and jade and lumberyards, which produce wood.

=== Training Buildings ===
These buildings train new types of workers and warriors from slave recruits. They include schools (small, medium and large) which train workers, who speed up production of a particular resource but specialise in that resource. Small schools can train only basic workers, medium schools can train most types of workers and large schools can train any, and train them faster. Small and medium schools can only train one type of worker, but large schools can train every type, but only one at a time. Another type of training building is the barracks: small, medium and large. The small and medium barracks produce warriors from slaves, but can only produce one type of warrior. The medium barracks takes less time to train warriors than the small barracks. The large barracks can produce any of the three types of warriors, but only one at a time. They also train warriors much faster than the small or medium barracks.

=== Storage Buildings ===
These buildings store all resources except mana and jewels. There are four types, in order of size and cost to produce they are: provision stores, small stores, medium stores and large stores.

=== Construction ===
To construct a building, slaves must be sent into an unfinished building. They will build it automatically, using the resources that realm has stored. If the realm does not have enough of one or more particular resource, they will use whatever there is stored, then wait until new resources are delivered to the realm, which must be done manually.

== Development ==
The development on Theocracy began when developer Philos Laboratories hired several new employees who had previous experience developing the game Perihelion: The Prophecy. It was decided that they would develop a new strategy title, with the goal of merging aspects of the games Command & Conquer and Civilization. The setting was decided by the game's graphic artists, deciding on an Aztec theme. Development continued for two years, with a planned release in spring 1999.

However, in March 1999 publisher Interactive Magic had decided to abandon boxed releases for their future titles, putting Theocracy in jeopardy. Philos eventually managed to buy back the publishing rights, and started updating the game to allow for a future release. These changes included redrawing most of the games graphics, switching the game resolution to 800x600, and the addition of "chronicles". The French publisher Ubisoft picked up the publishing rights, and work began on finishing the game for release. The game was finally released for both Windows and Linux on March 24, 2000. There was consideration towards a follow-up, focusing on as then undecided new civilization and using features thought up after the original game's development entered feature freeze.

== Reception ==
Theocracy received mixed reviews upon its release. Its strongest praise came from Eurogamer, with one reviewer stating that the game's "mix of real time and turn based strategy means that Theocracy takes place on a far larger canvas than a purely real time game ever could." The reviewer praised its wide scope and original ideas, separating it from many of its contemporaries. The British publication PC Zone was also impressed with the games originality, describing it as being "as refreshing as a pint of lager after a chicken vindaloo, and definitely worth shouting about." Other members of the press were less impressed, causing the game to only score a 72 on MobyGames. Reviewers criticized the game as being simple and archaic, while at the same time others thought that the interface was cumbersome and the learning curve was too steep.

Even though it was mostly unknown outside of Europe, the game managed to sell well enough, especially on Linux where it became a best-seller. One reviewer of the game's Linux port stated that "the game is a world apart from a lot of the linux games I've been playing lately. It's solid and feels nice to use - the buttons click with a satisfying sound played at the right moment, and it feels... professional." The port was also plagued with negative comments however, with many complaining about installation problems and about various technical faults (such as only being able to play the game in 16 bit colours and the lack of a proper full-screen mode). Even with these problems, it still holds an average of four out of five stars at The Linux Game Tome. A review in German print magazine LinuxUser was mostly positive.

== See also ==
- Kohan: Immortal Sovereigns
- Majesty: The Fantasy Kingdom Sim
