= Golgotha (video game) =

- Developer: Crack dot Com
- Publisher: Red Hat (Linux)
- Designers: Dave D. Taylor; Jonathan Clark
- Engine: Custom
- Platforms: Windows, Linux
- Release: Unreleased
- Genre: Real-time strategy
- Mode: Single-player

Golgotha is an unfinished video game that was being developed by Crack dot Com prior to shutting down in 1998. The game was to be a real-time strategy game, with elements from first-person shooter games. According to Dave Taylor, the game's name came from Shakespeare's King Lear tragedy, wherein Golgotha was a massive plain and a future battlefield.

== Plot ==
The game plays in the fictional future of the year 2048 AD, where a global nuclear disarmament and the coincidental murder of a beloved American archaeologist leads to an American military incursion in Iraq. Which, in turn, elicits a European military power play and begins World War III. The commander of the American force sent to invade Iraq questions his mission. With no suitable answers, he abandons his country and takes his troops on the quest for truth. In the try to recover what really happened at Golgotha they discover a supernatural conflict behind a veil of political discord.

== Development ==
After the successful release of Abuse in February 1996, Crack dot Com began with a new project, called Golgotha. The game was originally meant to be a real-time strategy game, with elements from first-person shooter games. This FPS/RTS hybrid should draw inspiration specifically from Doom and Command & Conquer.

=== Demo ===
The last released demo, version number 5c, was playable in Windows. It supported both software rendering and 3dfx Glide-based 3D cards. The demo included two levels, one based on Switzerland and one based on Cairo. The Switzerland demo level was the more complete one. In addition to this, the demo also had a non-interactive demo level that showed the terrain rendering capabilities of the graphics engine.

In the demo, the player controls a super-tank, which can be driven in first-person mode. In third-person mode, the player is presented with a bird's-eye view of the battlefield, and can command squads of individual units. The object of the level is to secure the enemy base and move any unit capable of taking over enemy bases to the "takeover pad" in the base.

=== Redesign ===
In September 1998, around the time the company folded, the gameplay had several issues: there was no way to control squads any more; grand-scale strategy was limited to choosing path for the produced units to follow. This didn't allow for much variation in gameplay. Also, many AI issues had been left unattended.

Though originally inspired by Command & Conquer, the team decided to abandon the traditional RTS format because both the team and budget proved to be ill-suited to solving the problems inherent in an RTS. As they would learn later, pathsolving and routing are famous for bringing RTS teams to their knees and theirs was no exception. Rather than suffer, they decide to pull the kill chain on it and adopt a simpler gameplay mechanic.

The removal of squad control in Golgotha was intentional. Crack Dot Com tossed C&C as the inspiration and embraced Rescue Raiders, changing it from a 1.5D RTS/action hybrid to a 2.5D RTS/action hybrid. In the new version of Golgotha, players controlled a supertank in a very twitchy action game. So squad control was reduced to picking a path, then queuing a rock-paper-scissors-ish sequence of baddies so that players could quickly return to control of their supertank.

This change improved gameplay. Artificial intelligence for the opposing supertank was still unreliable and posed another challenging problem, but it was a far more tractable problem than the initial pathsolving and routing problem, thus a much better fit for the team. By the time the team had finally settled on this, they had exhausted funds generated from sales of Abuse, in addition to minor funding from AMD for 3DNow! optimizations, and a donation from Richard Garriott.

=== Release into public domain ===
The unfinished game's assets were released to public domain on October 22, 2000. This included source code, game data, textures and music, some of which have been recycled into other games.

After the release, some volunteers started working on the game code. The development effort was rekindled as Golgotha Forever, headed by Mark O'Hara. However, the interest later died down.
