= Dominions: Priests, Prophets and Pretenders =

2001 video game

- Developer(s): Illwinter Game Design
- Publisher(s): Illwinter Game Design
- Platform(s): Linux, Solaris, Windows, Mac OS X
- Release: Linux, Solaris, Windows; July 2, 2001; Mac OS X; September 22, 2002
- Genre(s): Turn-based strategy
- Mode(s): Single-player, multiplayer

Dominions: Priests, Prophets and Pretenders is a turn-based strategy game designed by Illwinter Game Design, in which up to fourteen "pretender gods" at a time each battle for global dominance. The game was followed by five sequels: Dominions II: The Ascension Wars, Dominions 3: The Awakening, Dominions 4: Thrones of Ascension, Dominions 5: Warriors of the Faith, and Dominions 6: Rise of the Pantokrator.

== Gameplay ==
Two to fourteen "pretender gods" battle for global supremacy with over 600 units, 400 magic spells and 300 magical items. Players are allowed to customize their god, selecting physical appearance, magical skills and dominions scales, including luck, heat and order. The main map is divided into smaller sections (called provinces), and each battle that takes place is within a province, for control of the province. There can be hundreds of provinces on a map. To win, one must ensure that no other player controls a single province, or that their dominion is non-existent.

=== Units ===
Once each god and nation has been selected, each player must begin the process of building an empire. In the early stages of the game, this is mainly accomplished through the use of standard troops. The player must first recruit a commander (the player can also use his or her god). Each commander can lead a certain number of troops, a number which increases as the commander gains experience. In order to be effective, however, the commander also needs units. Each unit has its own attributes, such as strength and armor. Units are built by supplying a certain amount of gold and resource, the amount varying based on the unit. The units are then placed under the leadership of a commander, and are subdivided into squads by the player.

The player can set basic orders for each squad and place them on the battlefield in order to maximize their potential. For example, a player might place a squad of ranged units behind a squad of militia and light infantry and order it to fire on the closest enemy, so the archers are protected and provide cover for the infantry. The battles, however, are determined by computer calculations taking into account troop number, quality and pre-set tactics, and then may be viewed by the player as a short video clip. Units may rout during battle if they are outnumbered, or if their commander dies. If they make it off the battlefield, units will flee to the nearest friendly province. Units may also be wounded or killed in battle. Different wounds reduce different stats.

=== Magic ===
Although crucial to the game, units are not the only component. Magic is also key in deciding the victor of the match. Before a spell can be cast, it must be researched by mages. A mage is a commander with experience in one of the eight paths (elements) of magic. Generally, mages cannot lead any troops, but can research and cast powerful spells. There are many different types of spells, and as mages research the seven branches of magic, they unlock progressively more powerful spells, allowing them to do different things, from summoning powerful demons, to blasting enemies with powerful fireballs, to forging extremely powerful magical artifacts. Artifacts and powerful spells cost magic gems, which can be acquired from special magic sites within provinces. A powerful mage can defeat an army of hundreds of units, by routing and killing them.

=== Dominion ===
Dominion is a measure of a god's influence and worshipers. It is measured in candles, white candles being a god's dominion, black candles being other dominions. A nation is usually weaker while fighting in enemy dominion and stronger while fighting in its own dominion. Dominion can be spread in several ways. One way is via temples. There can be one temple build per province for a certain amount of gold. It will spread dominion to its province and all provinces near it. Another way is with a prophet or priest. Each nation can only have one prophet at a time, but as many priests as it wishes. A prophet is created when the "become prophet" order is given to a commander. Priests and prophets are commanders that are characterized by having holy magic and the ability to preach. Preaching spreads dominion like a temple, but priests and prophets can move and cast holy spells, which can be effective against certain types of enemies.
