= Spheres of Chaos =

- Archimedes box cover
- Developer(s): Iain McLeod
- Platform(s): Archimedes, Windows, PS2 Linux
- Genre(s): Multidirectional shooter
- Mode(s): Single-player, multiplayer

Spheres of Chaos is a multidirectional shooter video game, created by Iain McLeod, with basic gameplay similar to the 1979 arcade game Asteroids. The game has bright colours and patterns, with many enemies on screen at once. The audio is similar to that of Robotron: 2084 and Defender. It was originally written for RISC OS on the Acorn Archimedes and released in 1993. In the 2000s it was ported to Linux, Microsoft Windows, and PS2 Linux. In October 2007, Spheres of Chaos was declared freeware.

== Gameplay ==
The player controls a small grey spaceship. At the start of each level, enemies called common aliens appear that must be eradicated to complete the level. With each subsequent level, the enemies get more plentiful and powerful.

When hit, enemies typically split into smaller versions which must also be eradicated. Black holes also appear that either attract or repel the spaceship. Many black holes at once may make the game field unnavigable. When a level isn't completed within a certain period of time, enemies called bugs appear that shoot at the spaceship.

Many types of enemies appear in later levels, from spinshooters to multiplying daisies and bacteria. Often, when all common aliens are defeated, a boss appears that takes many hits to destroy.

When defeated, some enemies provide power-ups that constantly change colour. A power-up's power is determined by its colour when the spaceship captures it.

Up to eight players can take turns playing and have control over a wide variety of options, including quantities of specific enemies, frequency of power-ups, and visual effects.
