= Dave Taylor (game programmer) =

American video game programmer

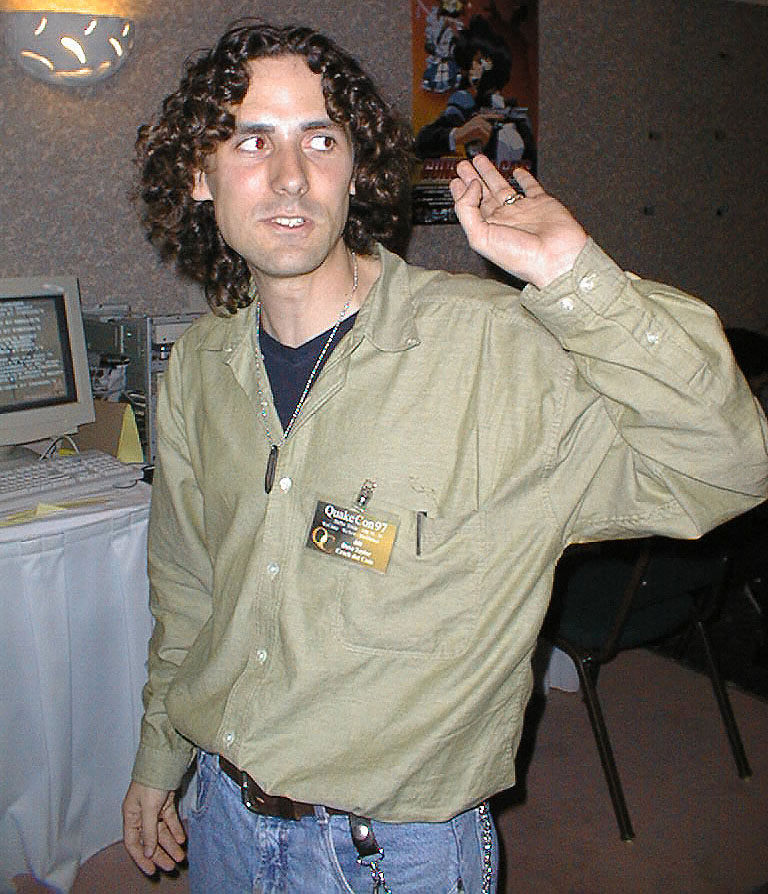
- Taylor at QuakeCon 1997
- Occupation: Video game programmer

Dave D. Taylor is an American video game programmer and producer. He worked at id Software during the development of Doom II and Quake, then left to found game developer Crack dot Com which shipped one game, Abuse, before folding. He has also been a promoter of Linux gaming.

== Early life ==
He graduated from the University of Texas at Austin with a Bachelor of Science degree in electrical engineering in 1993. Prior to working for id, he was a member of The Kernel Group, which worked on Unix kernel debugging.

== id Software ==
Taylor worked for id Software between 1993 and 1996, and was during the time involved with the development of Doom and Quake. He created ports of both games to IRIX, AIX, Solaris and Linux, and helped program the Jaguar ports of Doom and Wolfenstein 3D. He also considers himself to have been the "spackle coder" on Doom, for adding things such as the status bar, sound library integration, the automap, level transitions, cheat codes, and the network chat system. On Quake, he wrote the original sound engine, the TCP/IP network library for MS-DOS, and added VESA 2.0 support. One of the musical themes in Doom II, "The Dave D. Taylor Blues", was named after him by Robert Prince.

The 2003 book Masters of Doom: How Two Guys Created an Empire and Transformed Pop Culture mentions his habit of passing out from motion sickness after prolonged playing of Doom, and how the other employees would, after such incidents, sketch a body outline of his unconscious form with masking tape. After the success of the game, they bought him a couch to pass out on. His attempts to "talk up" Quake on-line, his purchase of an Acura NSX with Doom money, his friendship with American McGee, and his eventual departure from the company are also mentioned.

== After id ==
Taylor founded a small game company called Crack dot Com from 1996 to 1998. Crack dot Com released only one game, Abuse, an MS-DOS platform shooter programmed by Jonathan Clark. Taylor is credited as producer. In a 1997 interview, he claimed that he wasn't particularly proud of Abuse, and that "he set out to prove that a person could sell 50,000 copies of a so-so game." He then led the effort to build Golgotha, a first-person shooter / real-time strategy hybrid, but the company folded before its completion.

Between 1998 and 2001 he worked for Transmeta. He was president of Carbon6 from 2001 to 2002, there also working as lead designer and producer for the Game Boy Advance game Spy Kids Challenger. Since 2002 he has been vice president of Naked Sky Entertainment and since 2003 also an advisor and freelance game designer. He is also willing to act as a Linux game porter for pay projects.

In 2009, he produced Abuse Classic for the iPhone and Beakiez for Windows.
