= Linux for PlayStation 2 =

Software for the PlayStation 2

- Cover art for Linux for PlayStation 2
- Developer: Sony Computer Entertainment
- OS family: Linux (Unix-like)
- Working state: Discontinued
- Initial release: 2002; 24 years ago
- Supported platforms: PlayStation 2 SCPH-50000 and earlier
- Kernel type: Monolithic (Linux kernel)
- Default user interface: Window Maker
- Official website: web.archive.org/web/20100524023205/http://playstation2-linux.com:80/ (archived from the original)

Linux for PlayStation 2 (or PS2 Linux) is a kit released by Sony Computer Entertainment in 2002 that allows the PlayStation 2 console to be used as a personal computer. It includes a Linux-based operating system, a USB keyboard and mouse, a VGA adapter, a PS2 network adapter (Ethernet only), and a 40 GB hard disk drive (HDD). An 8 MB memory card is required; It must be formatted during installation, erasing all data previously saved on it, though afterwards the remaining space may be used for savegames. It is strongly recommended that a user of Linux for PlayStation 2 have some basic knowledge of Linux before installing and using it, due to the command-line interface for installation.

This kit has stopped being officially sold in the US as of 2003 due to the entire allocation of NTSC kits selling out. However, it is still available through some second-hand markets, such as eBay. The official site for the project was closed in June 2010 and communities like ps2dev are no longer active.

== Capabilities ==
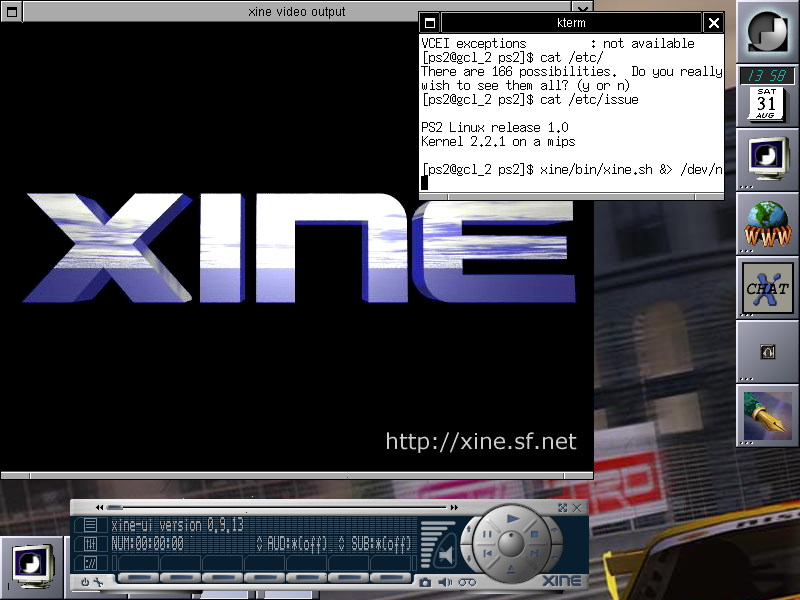
Screenshot

The Linux Kit turns the PlayStation 2 into a full-fledged computer system, but it does not allow for use of the DVD-ROM drive except to read PS1 and PS2 discs due to piracy concerns from Sony. Although the HDD included with the Linux Kit is not compatible with PlayStation 2 games, reformatting the HDD with the utility disc provided with the retail HDD enables use with PlayStation 2 games but erases PS2 Linux, though there is a driver that allows PS2 Linux to operate once copied onto the APA partition created by the utility disc. The Network Adapter included with the kit only supports Ethernet; a driver is available to enable modem support if the retail Network Adapter (which includes a built-in V.90 modem) is used. The kit supports display on RGB monitors (with sync-on-green) using a VGA cable provided with the Linux Kit, or television sets with the normal cable included with the PlayStation 2 unit.

The PS2 Linux distribution is based on Kondara MNU/Linux, a Japanese distribution itself based on Red Hat Linux. PS2 Linux is similar to Red Hat Linux 6, and has most of the features one might expect in a Red Hat Linux 6 system. The stock kernel is Linux 2.2.1 (although it includes the USB drivers from Linux 2.2.18 to support the keyboard and mouse), but it can be upgraded to a newer version such as 2.2.21, 2.2.26 or 2.4.17.

== Open-source applications ==
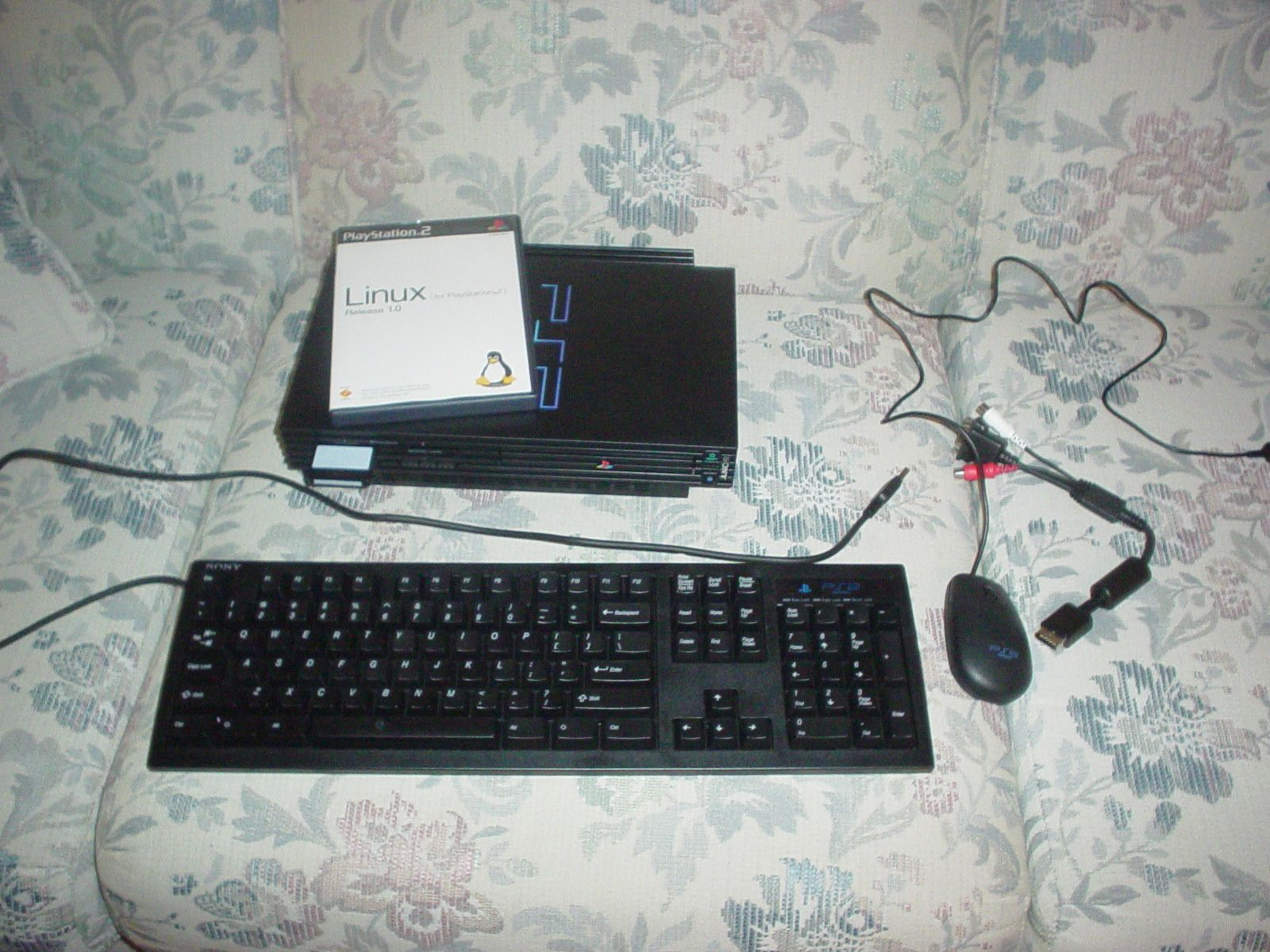
Contents of the Linux kit; the hard disk is already installed inside the machine, and the network adapter is attached to the back.

The Linux kit's primary purpose is amateur software development, but it can be used as one would use any other computer, although the small amount of memory in the PS2 (32MB) limits its applications. Noted open-source software that compiles on the kit includes Mozilla Suite, XChat, and Pidgin. Lightweight applications better suited to the PS2's 32MB of RAM include xv, Dillo, Ted, and AbiWord. The default window manager is Window Maker, but it is possible to install and use Fluxbox and FVWM. The USB ports of the console can be connected to external devices, such as printers, cameras, flash drives, and CD drives.

With PS2 Linux, a user can program their own games that will work under PS2 Linux, but not on an unmodified PlayStation 2. Free open source code for games is available for download from PS2 Linux support sites. There is little difference between PS2 Linux and the Linux software used on the more expensive system ("Tool", DTL-T10000) used by professional licensed PlayStation game programmers. Some amateur-created games are submitted to a competition such as the Independent Games Festival's annual competition. It is possible for an amateur to sell games or software that they develop using PS2 Linux, with certain restrictions detailed in the End User License Agreement. The amateur cannot make and sell game CDs and DVDs, but can sell the game through an online download.

== Model compatibility ==
The original version of the PS2 Linux kit worked on only the Japanese SCPH-10000, SCPH-15000 and SCPH-18000 PlayStation 2 models. It came with a PCMCIA interface card which had a 10/100 Ethernet port and an external IDE hard drive enclosure (as there is no room inside the unit). This kit cannot be used with any later model PS2 (which includes all non-Japanese models) because these models removed the PCMCIA port.

Later versions of the PS2 Linux kit use an interface very similar to the HDD interface/Ethernet sold later for network play (the later released Network adapter was also usable with the kit, including the built-in 56k modem.) This kit locates the hard drive internal to the PS2, in the MultiBay. With this kit, only the SCPH-30000 model of PlayStation 2 is officially supported. The kit does work equally well with models newer than SCPH-30000 with the exception that the Ethernet connection tended to freeze after a short period of use. Thus the newer SCPH-50000 PlayStation 2 model will only work correctly with PS2 Linux with an updated network adapter driver, which must be transferred to the PlayStation 2 HDD by using either an older model PlayStation 2 to transfer the driver or a Linux PC with an IDE port. Both methods involve swapping HDDs. This is due to the inability to use USB Mass Storage devices with the relatively old kernel (version 2.2.1) shipped with the kit.

The slim SCPH-70000 PlayStation 2 model does not work with PS2 Linux at all, due to the lack of a hard drive interface, though a very few early models in this revision had solder pads of an IDE interface on the motherboard that could be used (but required modding of the console, thereby voiding its warranty.) Even so, it is possible to network boot from a PXE server.

PS2 Linux installation DVDs are region encoded, as are all other PS2 game discs. A European/PAL disc will be rejected by an NTSC PlayStation 2 game system; however this is only at boot time: if the user has a mod that allows them to load a PAL disc, then the PS2 Linux boot loader supports both PAL and NTSC Linux (read the documentation to determine the button presses), so once they are past the "DVD not supported", they can boot Linux and then later start X Window in NTSC mode.

== Unofficial support ==
Ever since the discontinuation of the PS2 Linux Kit and some time before that there has been a large, active group who have tried and succeeded to run the Linux operating system through other methods. One notable example is the KernelLoader Linux loader developed by Mega Man, which requires users to copy the necessary kernel files onto removable storage or DVDs. Such storage media must be formatted as a Video DVD due to Sony's anti-piracy measures, which restrict the use of data DVDs.

Through this method it has become possible to use custom Linux distros and other UNIX-like operating systems compiled for the PlayStation 2 and this has enabled users to use more compatible Linux kernels with smaller footprints and programs specially designed for the console. These methods often require the use of PS2 exploits such as Free MCBoot which allows the end user to boot from the PlayStation 2 memory card and launch custom made homebrew applications packaged as ELF files and other exploits such as SwapMagic etc. Some other more invasive methods (such as the use of modchips or resoldering an IDE port on early 7000x models) require the opening of the PlayStation 2 console itself, voiding the warranty of the device if still applicable.

== See also ==
- Linux on the PlayStation 3
- Video games and Linux
- Steam Deck, Machine, and Frame
