= Perihelion: The Prophecy =

1993 video game

- Developer: Morbid Visions
- Publisher: Psygnosis
- Platform: Amiga
- Release: 1993
- Genre: Role-playing
- Mode: Single-player

Perihelion: The Prophecy is a role-playing video game developed by Morbid Visions and published by Psygnosis in 1993 for the Amiga.

== Gameplay ==
The player controls six characters who are supposed to save the realm they live in from an evil being which is slowly materialising into their dimension. The character races are rather unusual in RPGs and include Bionecrons, Symbions and various cross-breeds between humans, animals and mechanical entities.

The gameplay concerns juggling through the set of screens which are responsible for different parts of the game, such as exploring the dungeon and a world map, inventory management, spell creation (using a sophisticated runic system), network connections (used also for conversation purposes) and battle mode (a bit archaic, turn-based system). Everything is controlled from a set of icons.

The game has 32-color graphics which are mostly in grey and orange shades. The sound and music are conducted with attention to details, and the music changes depending on the action on the screen.

== Development ==
Perihelion: The Prophecy was created by only three people: Gyula Szentirmay (coder), Edvard Toth (graphic designer) and Zoltán Végh (musician). The whole management over the project was in hands of Edvard Toth who was responsible for the artwork, design, concept and story (in-game script and dialogue is big in size for almost 80 pages of written text). Two of them (Zoltán Végh and Gyula Szentirmay) would later help create the real-time strategy title Theocracy.

== Reception ==
The One gave Perihelion an overall score of 82%, stating that "It has an excellent style of presentation and works by an incredibibly user-friendly interface, but as atmospheric as Perihelion's setting, sound and graphics are, the game itself leaves a bit to be desired in a few areas." The One criticises the reuse of backgrounds in cities, calling this "a real mistake" and a "tacky American cartoon technique", furthermore noting that it leaves the player with "no real landmarks or helpful clues as to whether you've been there before." The One expresses that using Perihelion's 'network' communication UI for characters that the player is speaking to in person feels "unnatural" and "limiting". The One praises Perihelion's graphics and gameplay, stating that "Perihelion does look and feel superb ... There's a tremendous amount of depth with an excellent number of locations to be ploughed through, not to mention the huge volume of characters and spells to be played with." Despite this, The One expresses that Perihelion "could have been so much more" and that it "tried to do something different with the [RPG genre]" but in some areas it feels 'unpolished'.

Amiga Action rated the game an 84 of 100 saying "A massive and absorbing RPG with one the best storylines yet. Top-notch presentation combines with a wealth of detail and an impressive level of complexity to make this into a hardcore RPG player's dream. But a slightly tedious battle system, little variety in the locations and a lack of short-term action to sustain you as you progress towards your long term goal will probably make Perihelion seem a bit too dull for some of you.
