= Fiwix =

Operating system

- FiwixOS 3.6 with Fiwix kernel v1.8.0
- Developer: Jordi Sanfeliu i Font
- Written in: C, Assembly
- OS family: Unix-like
- Working state: Current
- Source model: Open source
- Initial release: 1.0.0 (April 23, 2018; 8 years ago)
- Latest release: 1.8.0 / (November 15, 2026; 0 days ago)
- Available in: English
- Supported platforms: i386
- Kernel type: Monolithic
- Default user interface: Command-line interface
- License: MIT License
- Official website: www.fiwix.org

Fiwix is an operating system kernel based on the UNIX architecture and fully focused on being POSIX compatible. It is designed and developed mainly as a hobbyist operating system, but it also serves for educational purposes. It runs on the i386 hardware platform and is compatible with a good base of existing GNU applications. It follows the UNIX System V application binary interface and is also mostly Linux 2.0 i386 system call ABI compatible.

The FiwixOS 3.6 operating system is a Fiwix distribution. It uses the Fiwix kernel, includes the GNU toolchain (GCC, Binutils, Make), it uses Newlib v4.6.0 as its C standard library, and Ext2 as its primary file system.

Between October 2022 and the whole 2023 the Fiwix kernel accepted a series of patches that were necessary to be able to be compiled with TCC. This was a necessary step into the whole bootstrapping process to build a complete Linux distribution from scratch, with Fiwix being currently a crucial part of it.

== Features ==
Features according to the official website include:

- Written in ANSI C language (Assembly used only in the needed parts).
- GRUB Multiboot Specification v1 compliant.
- Full 32bit protected mode non-preemptive kernel.
- For i386 processors and higher.
- Preemptive multitasking.
- POSIX compliant (mostly).
- Process groups, sessions and job control.
- Interprocess communication with pipes, signals and UNIX-domain sockets.
- UNIX System V IPC (semaphores, message queues and shared memory).
- BSD file locking mechanism (POSIX restricted to whole file and advisory only).
- Virtual memory splits (user/kernel): 3GB/1GB and 2GB/2GB.
- Demand paging with Copy-On-Write feature.
- Linux 2.0 ABI system calls compatibility (mostly).
- ELF-386 executable format support (statically and dynamically linked).
- Round Robin based scheduler algorithm (no priorities yet).
- VFS abstraction layer.
- Kexec support.
- Ext2 filesystem support with 1KB, 2KB and 4KB block sizes.
- Minix v1 and v2 filesystem support.
- Linux-like Proc filesystem support (read only).
- ISO9660 filesystem support with Rock Ridge extensions.
- RAMdisk device support.
- Initial RAMdisk (initrd) image support.
- Networking support with the integration of lwIP into the kernel (BETA).
- SVGALib based applications support.
- PCI local bus support.

- QEMU/Bochs graphics adapter.
- PCI serial devices.
- PCI ATA controllers.
- Realtek RTL8139 network adapter.

- UNIX98 pseudoterminals (pty) and devpts filesystem support.
- Virtual consoles support (up to 12).
- Keyboard driver with Linux keymaps support.
- PS/2 mouse support.
- Frame buffer device support for VESA VBE 2.0+ compliant graphic cards.
- Framebuffer console (fbcon) support.
- Serial port RS-232 driver support.
- Remote serial console support.
- QEMU Bochs-style debug console support.
- Basic implementation of a Pseudo-Random Number Generator.
- Floppy disk device driver and DMA management.
- IDE/ATA hard disk device driver.
- IDE/ATA ATAPI CD-ROM device driver.
