= Illwinter Game Design =

Swedish video game developer

- Type: Handelsbolag (Trading partnership)
- Industry: Video games
- Founded: September 27, 2001
- Headquarters: Sweden
- Key people: Johan Karlsson; Kristoffer Ostermann
- Products: Dominions; Conquest of Elysium
- Number of employees: 2
- Website: http://illwinter.com/

Illwinter Game Design is a Swedish independent video game developer composed of Johan Karlsson and Kristoffer Osterman. The company was started in the 1990s under the name Bogus Game Design, but later changed its name. Registered officially as Illwinter since September 18, 2001, the team's product catalogue includes two long-running series of fantasy strategy games: Conquest of Elysium and Dominions. Illwinter's games are characterized by large amount of content, depth, lasting playability, support for multiple platforms (Linux, Mac OS X, Solaris and Windows included), multiplayer support and simple visual and sound effects. Labor division within the tiny team is simple: Kristoffer Osterman creates the units, spells and descriptions, while Johan Karlsson makes everything else work.

Both Johan Karlsson and Kristoffer Osterman have expressed their love for role-playing games, especially Ars Magica and roguelikes. Kristoffer Osterman teaches religion, math and social sciences as a primary occupation.

== Games by Illwinter ==
- Conquest of Elysium (released in 1996 for Atari ST)
- Conquest of Elysium II (released in 1997)
- Dominions: Priests, Prophets and Pretenders (released in 2001)
- Dominions II: The Ascension Wars (released at the end of 2003)
- Dominions 3: The Awakening (released in October 2006)
- Conquest of Elysium 3 (released in February 2012)
- Dominions 4: Thrones of Ascension (released in October 2013)
- Conquest of Elysium 4 (released in November 2015)
- Dominions 5: Warriors of the Faith (released in November 2017)
- Conquest of Elysium 5 (released in August 2021)
- Dominions 6: Rise of the Pantokrator (released in January 2024)
