= Dominions 5: Warriors of the Faith =

2017 video game

Dominions 5 - Warriors of the Faith
- Developer: Illwinter Game Design
- Publisher: Illwinter Game Design
- Platforms: Microsoft Windows, Linux, macOS
- Release: November 27, 2017
- Genre: Strategy
- Modes: Single-player, multiplayer, cooperative video game

Dominions 5: Warriors of the Faith is a 4X turn-based strategy game created and published by Illwinter Game Design in 2017. It is characterized by simplistic graphics, a functional UI, and deep gameplay, with a roster of over 80 playable nations able to interact with more than 900 unique spells, 400 magic items, and thousands of different unit types. Players take on the role of pretenders, immortals with vast magical powers who are venerated as gods by a given nation. Their goal is to spread their faith, eliminate rival Pretenders and ascend as supreme god of their world. Compared to its predecessor, Dominions 4: Thrones of Ascension, Dominions 5 has been described as mainly a refinement, introducing real time combat for battles between armies, revising map generation, and a new system for blessings allowing the bonuses bestowed by gods to their nation to be customized.

== Gameplay ==
Dominions 5 is a turn-based strategy game in which players control a pretender god, their chosen nation, numerous individualized mages and commanders and armies eventually counting hundreds of units.

=== Combat ===
Battles in Dominions 5 are auto-resolved, with armies executing simple scripts prepared in advance by the players; these battles are resolved between turns and can be watched as replays. Initially focused on combat between units, battles increasingly become influenced by magic as the game progresses and more advanced spells are researched. These combat spells can range from buffs or debuffs to units on the battlefield, to summoning new units to fight for the battle's duration, to directly causing damage to units on the field through such effects as thunderbolts and fireballs.

=== Faction management ===
Dominions 5 has relatively light economic management compared to other 4X games, instead focusing on military strategy, army recruitment, commander management and magic research. Armies move in a Risk-like fashion between provinces and are recruited using resources drawn from controlled territories. Late game "ritual spells", which are spells cast from the campaign map, can drastically alter the world and its strategic situation.

=== Nations ===
The game's nations mostly eschew traditional fantasy tropes and are instead mainly inspired from mythology; one faction in particular is drawn in part from the Cthulhu mythos. Nations are varied, ranging from human kingdoms to factions ruled by giants, the descendants of angels, demons, and other fantastical creatures; some begin the game underwater, and others have entirely undead rosters of units, resulting in meaningfully different experiences in terms of map navigation, recruitment and army performance.

=== Multiplayer ===
Dominions 5 is mainly meant to be played online with other human players, either in rapid "blitz" games or through a play-by-email system. When playing with other people, diplomacy becomes a key layer of the game, as relatively long periods between turns (most play-by-email games average one turn per day) allow complex negotiations and deal-making between players.

== Reception ==
Dominions 5 has received generally positive reviews which cited its complexity and depth, but which criticized its intimidating or ugly appearance, the amount of micromanagement involved, and the relative simplicity of its AI. It has received over a thousand customer reviews on Steam which aggregate to a "Very Positive" rating as of January 2022.
