= Lutris =

Game manager for Linux

- Logo of Lutris

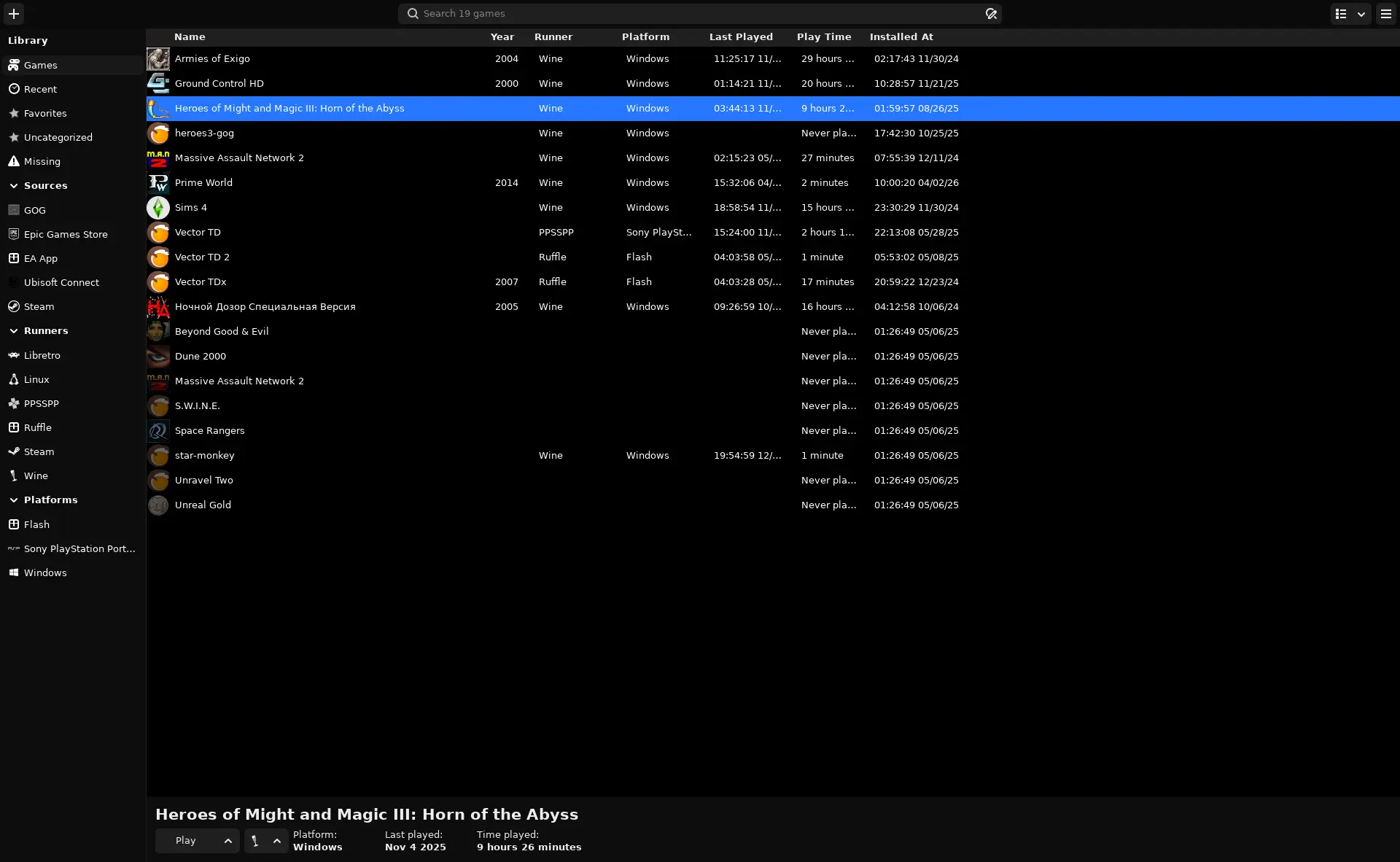
- Developers: Community; Mathieu Comandon
- Release: February 23, 2010; 16 years ago
- Stable release: 0.5.22 / 24 February 2026
- Written in: Python, GObject
- Operating system: Linux
- Available in: English
- License: GNU General Public License
- Website: lutris.net
- Repository: github.com/lutris/lutris

Lutris is a free and open source game manager for Linux-based operating systems developed and maintained by Mathieu Comandon and the community, released under the GNU General Public License.

== History ==
Lutris began as a piece of software called Oblivion Launcher in 2009. Authored by Mathieu Comadon, its purpose was to provide an easier way to manage his games running on Linux, especially the ones that ran using Wine. Lutris began development on Launchpad on 5 May 2009. The first public release, 0.1, was on 29 November 2009. In 2010, development moved to GitHub.

In 2013, when Steam support was first added to Lutris, OMG! Ubuntu! noted that the database of Lutris games had thus far been limited. They also noted that while it was possible to submit installers for the Lutris database, each addition needed to be manually approved by the Lutris development team.

== Features ==
For games that require using Wine, community installer scripts are available that automatically configure the Wine environment. Lutris also offers integration for software purchased from GOG, Humble Bundle, Steam, and Epic Games Store; those can be launched directly through the Lutris application. Additionally, Lutris supports over 20 emulators including DOSBox, ScummVM, MAME, Snes9x, Dolphin, PCSX2 and PPSSPP.

== Controversy ==
In February 2026, a user asked "is lutris slop now" after noticing an increase in "LLM generated commits" to Lutris's Github repository. Comandon replied that the AI is "tremendously helpful" and removed all of the Claude co-authorship on those commits from the past few days, hiding what parts of the code were generated with AI. This move was criticized for harming trust in the project and creating a copyright issue over who owns the code in each commit. The Claude co-authorship was restored a few days later.

== See also ==
- Video games and Linux
- Wine
- Vulkan
- SteamOS
