= Dominions 3: The Awakening =

2006 video game

- Developer(s): Illwinter Game Design
- Publisher(s): Shrapnel Games (2006-2012); Desura and GamersGate (2012); Steam (2013)
- Platform(s): Linux, Mac OS X, Microsoft Windows
- Release: September 29, 2006
- Genre(s): Turn-based strategy
- Mode(s): Single-player, multiplayer

Dominions 3: The Awakening is a fantasy turn-based strategy game created by Illwinter and published in 2006 by Shrapnel Games. It is the third game in the Dominions series, preceded by Dominions: Priests, Prophets and Pretenders and Dominions II: The Ascension Wars. Illwinter's publishing contract with Shrapnel Games expired in November 2012 and Dominions 3 was republished on Desura in late December and soon after on GamersGate. Dominions 3 went through the Greenlight process and was released on Steam in September 2013.

The game combines a simple presentation with an extremely wide array of strategic options, including over 1500 units, 600 spells and 300 magic items. Turns are resolved simultaneously, with players planning battles rather than directly controlling them.

The game includes scenarios and randomized play, but does not include a campaign. Dominions 3 is mainly designed for multiplayer, including PBEM, hotseat and TCP/IP. AI opponents are available for single-player.

== Overview ==
The game allows the player to design a pretender god with the potential to ultimately become the god of a fantasy world by defeating all other pretenders. The interface consists of a hand-drawn or randomly generated world map and several menus. The maps are divided into provinces which can be conquered in tactical battles. Provinces provide gold and resources, needed to recruit units. Compared to other games in the genre, Dominions 3 only has a small amount of economic management, focusing almost entirely on creating and deploying armies.

At the start of the game, each player begins with a predetermined number of provinces, typically one. This starting province is the nation's capital, with a fortress, temple, and magic laboratory. From here, the player can recruit soldiers, commanders, mages and priests to wage war upon their enemies. Mages cast spells, forge items, summon units, conduct research and search for magical sites. Priests can preach against enemy dominions in addition to using holy spells.

Provinces that believe in the player's god are considered part of that god's dominion and enjoy several advantages: the player's troops fight better, enemy forces are penalized, and the global scales (things like temperature, magic resistance, luck, and supplies) are slowly changed to the controlling god's liking. Friendly dominion is indicated with white candles, whilst enemy dominion is shown with black candles. Should a player lose all provinces or all dominion, they will lose the game.

While the game does not permit the alteration of core rules, it does support substantial modding capabilities; one could conceivably replace or substantially modify every unit and every spell, for instance. Mods have changed nations, duplicated nations, and added new ones.

=== Combat ===
The combat system is elaborated in detail; each unit amongst hundreds in an army has several values like morale, hit-points, strength, encumbrance, health problems due to previous battle wounds, protection separately for torso, head and legs, and precision. Most units will rout if their squad takes too many casualties, rather than fighting to the death. Logistics is important, with starving troops likely to rout, and mindless creatures like controlled undead or magically summoned beings do not rout at all, they simply dissolve if their commanding unit dies or routs.

There are hundreds of different units to recruit within the game, including archers, infantry, cavalry and mages. Troops can be recruited in all provinces (except Late Age Ermor's capital), and which types are often influenced by the terrain. For example, woodsmen and druids can be found in forest provinces, while aquatic fish-men can be found on coasts. In order to recruit nation-specific troops, the player has to construct a fortress. Mages require a laboratory to recruit, whilst priests need a temple.

The battle results are calculated by the computer and can be viewed by the players at the beginning of the next turn, like a film, or the battle may be instantly calculated and a summary displayed to the player bearing the relevant numbers. The battles cannot be influenced once the computer calculates the new turn, but players can set simple orders for their troops before the battle is calculated, allowing for basic tactics. This system allows for fast multiplayer games.

=== Magic ===
There are eight paths of magic in the game: fire, water, air, earth, astral, death, nature and blood. Mages in Dominions 3 have one or more paths, with nations having distinct mages and therefore a different magical emphasis. Many spells or items require two paths to cast or forge, respectively, but none require more than two.

All mages can use magic on the battlefield, but to cast powerful spells or summon strong creatures, magic gems are required. These are mostly found in magical sites hidden around the world. Every nation starts with a basic gem income, but to get more, provinces need to be searched by a mage. There are seven types of magical gems, corresponding with the paths of magic. Blood magic does not use gems, requiring the sacrifice of captured slaves instead. Mages can also use gems to create magic items and artifacts, which can be equipped by commanders to increase their abilities or convey special effects, usually in combat.

Magic research is conducted in the seven schools of magic, distinct from the paths. These are conjuration, alteration, evocation, construction, enchantment and thaumaturgy. Again, blood magic is distinct, being its own school as well as its own path.

Priests also have a 'holy' path, but in the unmodded game that path is normally associated with a far smaller set of spells, none of which need to be researched and all of which are battle spells.

=== Nations ===
The nations in the game are based upon world history and mythology, rather than standard high fantasy races such as elves and orcs. Amongst others, the mythologies of ancient Greece (Arcoscephale), the Roman Republic (Ermor), Byzantium (Pythium), Sarmatians (Sauromatia), Egypt (C'tis), Medieval France & Spain (Marignon), Medieval England (Man), Ireland (Fomoria, Eriu, Tir na n'Og), Scandinavia (Vanheim, Helheim, Jotunheim, Midgard, Utgard, Nieflheim), Germany (Ulm), China (Tien Chi), Zimbabwe (Machaka), Japan (Jomon), Aztecs (Mictlan), Rus' (Bogarus), and India (Kailasa, Lanka, Bandar Log, Patala) are represented. Other nations are based on the work of recent writers, particularly H. P. Lovecraft (R'lyeh), or Abysia, that looks loosely based on Yezidi faith, as it contains Melek Taus in its list of random general names and is mostly associated with holy flames, beings of flame, fire worship and magma, or Hinnom, which is based on Semitic mythology, featuring Nephilim.

=== Patches ===
Several patches have been released by the developers since the initial release of the game. The patches provide among bugfixes usually game improvements like new commands for modders and map-makers as well as complete new nations (including unique nation-specific summons and spells).

== Reception ==
The editors of Computer Games Magazine named Dominions 3 the seventh-best computer game of 2006. They wrote: "There are very few games that show you as much as you'll see here—a nearly infinite variety of rising gods and dying empires and a fat man with a magic belt—and no games that do it with the focus, depth, and extraordinary economy of Dominions 3".
