= Dominions II: The Ascension Wars =

2003 video game

- Developer: Illwinter Game Design
- Publisher: Shrapnel Games
- Platforms: Windows, Linux, PowerPC (Mac OS X / Linux), Solaris (Solaris 8)
- Release: NA: November 14, 2003
- Genres: Turn-based strategy, fantasy
- Modes: Single-player, multiplayer

Dominions II: The Ascension Wars is a 4X turn-based, computer strategy game. It was developed by Illwinter Game Design and published by Shrapnel Games. The game was released on November 14, 2003, in North America for Microsoft Windows, Mac OS X and Linux.

Dominions II: The Ascension Wars was the sequel to Dominions: Priests, Prophets and Pretenders. It was followed by Dominions 3: The Awakening in 2006.

== Gameplay ==
Dominions II: The Ascension Wars is a 4X turn-based, computer strategy game. The players play the role of the god of one out of 17 different nations and battle each other for the dominance of a fantasy world. At the most basic level, Dominions II is similar to Risk. It is also similar to Civilization. The world is divided into many provinces that change hands after a tactical battle. The players use armies of men and monsters to fight these battles.

=== Game planning and startup ===
The players and game host (who may also play) find each other through out-of-game channels and decide on game setup. These decisions include:

- which player will play which nation
- the map which will be used
- the game patch version and any modifications
- settings of adjustable game parameters, such as strength of independent forces, difficulty of magical research, and frequency of random events and magic sites
- how frequently players will expect turns to be played
- any house rules for the game

Each player then designs their god. Each god-type costs design points which can be spent on the god's dominion properties, his/her magical abilities, or on the national castle type. The god's initial magic levels also determine the effect of the god's blessing, a special ability which enhances certain types of sacred troops. A god who wields powerful fire magic will enhance the attack skill of such troops and even set their weapons ablaze, whereas a god who focuses on nature magic will instead allow them to go berserk. It is possible to make a god who excels at magic and magical research but is physically weak, as well as a near-unkillable warrior-god with barely any magical powers at all. Dominion effects are adjusted by using design points to 'tilt' 6 scales (graphically 6 balance scales), which represent the nature of the god which becomes manifest in territory under his dominion. The 6 scales are Order/Turmoil, Productivity/Sloth, Heat/Cold, Growth/Death, Luck/Misfortune, and Magic/Drain.

Players each send the file with their pretender design to the host, who starts the game.

=== Game phases ===
Each turn of the game is split into two phases:

=== The planning phase ===
Each player's turn is a process of assessing the apparent opportunities and risks, and acting to advance their plans for world domination. Recruiting new units, sending messages to other players, reviewing the provinces' tax and unrest levels, and directing magic research are all ways of directing the nation overall.

Players also give specific orders to each of their commanders at the strategic level, such as attacking enemy territory (with any troops under their command); casting a ritual magic spell; forging a magical object; assassinating an enemy commander while hiding in enemy domain; or constructing a building (temple, laboratory, or castle). Planning for combat involves organizing troops under commanders and issuing up to five tactical battle instructions (such as magic spells to cast) to the commanders, and simpler orders to troop squads. Each commander can control up to 5 squads and his leadership skills limit the total and kinds of troops he can command. Leading magical, undead, or demonic troops requires appropriate magical skills. Troops and commanders are organized and a simple overhead-view grid can be used to place them in specific starting locations for combat.

Once all orders are set, the player sends his turn-file by email or by TCP/IP-connection to the host-computer.

=== The execution phase ===
The host-computer calculates the results of all battles and random events simultaneously and sends the result-files back to the players. The players can now view the results of last turn's orders and events, watch the replays of the battles and proceed with the planning phase of the next turn.

=== Features ===
Dominions II also includes AI for single player games.

Supply and morale are modeled in the game world and play an important role. Dominion (how much a province believes in player's god versus another player's) affects not only combat morale but also the local settings of the province such as climate, richness, luck/bad events or available supply. Strategic preaching can not only shift the outcome of future battles; it can allow a "theological" bloodless victory: if a player loses his dominion in all his provinces, he also loses the game, but mighty his armies may be.

Each nation and theme also have a set of national heroes, which may appear and volunteer to serve as leaders as the game progresses, unless that nation is unlucky.

Different maps are available as well as (player-made) mods. Much of the game is customizable with the help of a simple text editor and paint program.

=== Tactics ===
Dominions II allows the players to make some tactical decisions for their units in battle, by setting the combat behaviour of each of their combat units ahead of time. When battle is processed, the player's troops will follow the orders they have been given.

The kinds of tactical commands include whether to attack, delay an attack, retreat, fire missile weapons, use melee weapons or which kind of enemy to target. For commanders, more control is possible. Players can tell them exactly what spells to cast, or exactly how long to wait before performing another kind of action.

== Setting ==
There are seventeen playable nations, each of which has its own selection of troops, commanders, priests and mages. Many nations also have access to unique spells or choices of Pretender, as well as various abilities such as a bonus to castle defense, dominion which spreads death and decay, and more. Many nations may be found in several variants, known as themes, each of which represents a different historical era or alternate timeline. For example, the default form of Ermor is a human empire on the brink of perdition. Ermor's two alternate themes (which may be interpreted as the future of default Ermor), Ashen Empire and Soul Gate, are both wholly undead nations with radically different units and abilities.

=== Abysia ===
Abysia is a parched wasteland inhabited by large, lava-based humanoids. They radiate heat, which fatigues their enemies and can set them on fire. They have powerful fire and blood magic, and prefer hot provinces. Abysian infantry is strong and heavily armored, but Abysia commands no native mounted troops. Abysia's warlocks add some variety to the nation's troop and commander roster by selectively cross-breeding Abysians, humans, and demons. Abysia may also recruit assassins. They also train salamanders that burn nearby enemies.

=== Atlantis ===
A nation very loosely based on the Atlanteans described by Plato. Their troops are either marine or amphibious, and their mages proficient in all forms of magic, particularly water. Atlantis is one of the two nations that may build castles underwater.

=== Pythium ===
Based on Byzantium, these humans combine effective troops and extremely powerful, but expensive mage-priests. Pythium offers recruitable "communicants" (which lend their strength to battlefield mages, enhancing their power), hydra monsters, assassins, one-shot gladiators and spear-throwing infantry. It lacks affordable cavalry, substitutes inferior slingers for archers, and has one of the worst militias (province defense) in the game.

=== Man ===
A human nation with longbows, knights, witches and rabble-rousing bards, loosely based on Celtic mythology.

=== Ulm ===
Uses earth magic with the heavily armoured human troops and great castle-siegers/protectors. Steel is preferred over casting spells, and the master smiths produce items at a discount. Having the same name as a German city, this nation could be loosely based on medieval Germany, which is also famous for armor along with other forge knowledge.

=== Caelum ===
A nation of winged humans ruled by a magical oligarchy, which institutes a rigid caste system. Caelians dwell in cold regions, and many of their troops wear magical ice armor which hardens in colder climes. Caelum employs the game's most cost-effective mages (albeit not the most versatile), and wields both air and water magic. Ground-based Caelian armies typically consist of socially outcast "wingless" (born indistinguishable from humans), temple guards (holy warriors who have torn off their own wings as a sign of loyalty), and mammoths.

=== C'tis ===
An ancient civilization of lizardmen combining elements from both ancient Egypt and Robert E. Howard's Stygia. C'tis boasts powerful mages of death and nature, skeleton-summoning assassins and, under one theme, a dominion that causes disease.

=== Arcoscephale ===
An ancient human kingdom modeled on Ancient Greece, with strong astral and elemental magic. A true magic nation, "Arco" can build magic laboratories for less gold then other nations. The famous Priestesses from Arco have the unique ability to heal battle afflictions and even diseases. Arcos can recruit several variants of spear-wielding hoplites supported by primitive cavalry, war elephants, and chariots.

=== Ermor ===
A decadent human empire in its twilight years, based on the declining Roman Empire. Ermor's thaumaturges learned the secrets of death magic from the sauromancers of C'tis, but made irresponsible use of these powers and thereby nearly brought about the empire's downfall.

=== Marignon ===
A fanatical human nation roughly based on medieval France during the Inquisition. Sacred Flagellants and knights can be blessed by powerful priests, who are also masters of fire magic and preach effectively against enemy faith. Marignon can cause unrest in enemy lands with its spy and kill enemy leaders with its assassins, while its crossbowmen shoot armor-piercing bolts against invading armies.

=== Pangaea ===
A nature nation, consisting of halfmen from Greek mythology like Pans and Maenads. All troops of Pangea can heal their own battle afflictions, and most units can employ stealth tactics.

=== Vanheim ===
A nation of humans, vanir, and dwarven smiths inspired by Norse mythology. Vanir commanders can sail with troops across ocean provinces to attack at unexpected coastal regions in keeping with their viking inspired theme.

=== Jotunheim ===
Another nation inspired by Norse mythology. The Jotun are a race of frost giants, adept at the magics of blood, nature, and water. Jotunheim's giants are supported by stealthy vættir. Jotun militia provide the strongest province defense of all nations.

=== R'lyeh ===
An amphibious race from a distant star, based on the writings of H. P. Lovecraft. R'lyeh's armies consist of powerful astral mages and telepaths, enslaved Atlanteans, half-human hybrids, and a wide range of bizarre creatures summoned from "the void". R'lyeh may construct castles underwater.

=== T'ien Ch'i ===
A human nation based on medieval China. They field a variety of foot soldiers and archers, as well as having horse archers and cavalry. Their casters wield a very broad range of magic, with a moderate emphasis on water spells. T'ien Ch'i is widely considered to be a weak nation, with only average troops and inadequate mages. They are especially vulnerable to the astral duel spell.

=== Mictlan ===
Aztec-like humans with archaic troops but powerful blood magic. Its commanders conscript slaves into its armies.

=== Machaka ===
A human kingdom modeled on African tribes. Machaka's elite troops ride giant spiders. Similarly, Machaka's more powerful sorcerers turn into giant spiders when injured, an ability inherited from an ancient, dead god from whom these mages are descended.

== Reception ==
Reception

Review scores
Publication	Score
1Up.com	A
GameSpot	6.2 out of 10
GameZone	7.8 out of 10
IGN	6.5 out of 10

Dominions II was praised for its flexibility in allowing the player to command and customise his armies in a large number of ways. The game's immersiveness and gameplay detail was also appreciated, noting particular appeal to strong fans of the strategy game genre. The long lifespan of Dominions II was also commented on, with the way gameplay concepts are introduced in stages being particularly impressive. It was also noted that because of the large number of options, it is unlikely that a game will be repeated in the same way more than once.

The way that Dominions II introduces new gameplay concepts was found to present a steep learning curve to the player, requiring constant reference to a manual. This also lead to reviewers describing the game as being over-complicated. The user interface, despite being streamlined from the original, was still described as cumbersome and unintuitive in areas, requiring the player to forcibly exit the game in order to correct errors in turn phases. The graphical representation of the player's armies and battles was also described as being "1998-era", offering little feedback on the progress of encounters with opposing troops.

Computer Games Magazine named Dominions II the third-best computer game of 2003, and presented it with an award for "Best Independent Game". The editors wrote that "there's no fantasy game more epic, varied and vivid" than Dominions II. The editors of Computer Gaming World nominated Dominions II for their 2003 "Strategy Game of the Year" award, which ultimately went to Age of Wonders: Shadow Magic. They called it the year's best 4X title, and wrote that they "found it impossible to ignore the [game's] almost overwhelming depth of strategy".
