= Inner Worlds (video game) =

1996 video game

- Developer: Sleepless Software
- Publisher: Sleepless Software
- Platforms: Linux, MS-DOS
- Release: 1996
- Genre: Platform
- Mode: Single player

Inner Worlds is a 1996 platform game for Linux and MS-DOS by Sleepless Software. It incorporates some fantasy role-playing game elements. Inner Worlds focuses on a werewolf character called Nikita who travels through a magical world fighting monsters and learning spells.

== Gameplay ==
Although the game appears to be a typical platform game with levels grouped into three episodes, there are many RPG elements, which make the game much more complex. Although episodes must be played in proper order, the level structure of the game is not strictly linear as it is possible to skip some levels and return to them later in the episode. In addition to jumping, running and fighting monsters, Nikita is able to shapeshift into a wolf at any time, if she has enough mana, which gives her access to otherwise inaccessible locations. She also can collect many kinds of weapons and other special items such as keys, scrolls and potions. Some of them can give her some special abilities. It is even possible to enchant the weapon chosen by the player to dramatically change its power and behavior.

=== Character development system ===
Unlike other games at the time, in Inner Worlds the main character gets stronger through the course of the game in addition to collecting new items and weapons, as would be expected in a role playing game. On almost every level the player is able to find an amulet which increases maximum mana or health. Killing unusual monsters allows the player to learn some spells to create magical arrows or fireballs.

== Plot ==
The story is revealed to the player by long text introductions before each level. In the first episode Wizard's World, Nikita travels into the Castle Drofanayrb (whose name is the name of programmer Bryan A. Ford spelled backwards) to defeat the powerful monster called Gralob, which was created by a powerful mage and now is the scourge of the land. In the second episode World of Change, she returns to her homeland to discover further horrors – and to fight them. In the third episode Heart of the World, she descends into the large volcano in order to engage in a final confrontation with evil forces.

== Development ==
The Sleepless Software team was originally three people from Salt Lake City, with Inner Worlds being their first project. The team grew to 27 people from 9 countries. It was planned for one year of development, but ended up taking three.

The music tracks played were written by different people who won a contest held for that purpose on the Internet. The game's creators offered $100 for all the songs they choose to put in the game, and $1,000 as the first prize for the contest winner. The winner was Daniel Hansson from Sweden for the track called Unplugged. The authors of other songs used in the game were from locations as disparate as Croatia, Netherlands, Slovakia, Australia, US and Finland.

== Release ==
In 1996 Inner Worlds was released for MS-DOS and Linux. The first episode, Wizard's World, was distributed as shareware.

Around 2001 the developers released the game as freeware on their website.
