= Abuse (video game) =

1996 video game

- Developers: Crack dot Com; Exakt Entertainment (iOS)
- Publishers: MS-DOS: NA: Electronic Arts; EU: Origin Systems; Mac OS; Bungie
- Producer: Dave Taylor
- Designer: Duong Nguyen
- Programmer: Jonathan Clark
- Artists: Murray McMillan; Duong Nguyen
- Composer: Bobby Prince
- Platforms: MS-DOS, Mac OS, Archimedes, AmigaOS, AmigaOS 4, iOS, Android, Linux, OpenBSD, IBM AIX
- Release: MS-DOS: NA: March 1996; EU: 1996; Mac OS: NA: March 5, 1997; Amiga: EU: 1998; iOS; August 13, 2009; Linux; October 11, 2011; AIX; September 26, 1996
- Genre: Run and gun
- Modes: Single-player, multiplayer

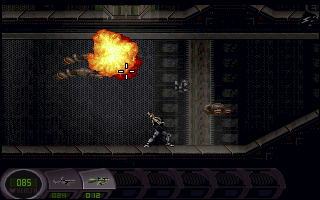
Vrenna using his grenade launcher on two flyers.

Abuse is a run and gun video game developed by Crack dot Com and published by Electronic Arts in North America and Origin Systems in Europe. It was released on February 29, 1996 for MS-DOS. A Mac OS port of the game was published by Bungie and released on March 5, 1997. The game's source code, along with some of the shareware content, has been in the public domain since the late 1990s and has been ported to Linux and many other platforms.

== Plot ==
The protagonist of the game, Nick Vrenna, has been unjustly incarcerated in a prison where the staff are performing unethical medical experiments upon the inmates. A prison riot occurs and an experiment goes horribly wrong. The people inside the prison - except for Nick, who seems to be immune - are infected with a substance called Abuse that transforms them into monsters. With the water supply in danger of being infected, Nick arms himself and fights through the horde to prevent this, and then escapes from the prison complex.

== Gameplay ==
Abuse resembles a side-scrolling platform game. The keyboard is used to move Nick, while the mouse is used for aiming the weapons. The gameplay consists of fighting various enemies (mostly the various forms of mutants, who prefer to attack in huge swarms) and solving simple puzzles, usually involving switches.

Networked play, through IPX/SPX, is supported.

== Development ==
Abuse had a very different storyline coming out of production. The update for it replaced the original introduction with the current storyline. The original involved an invasion by an alien species called "ants". The player was a special ops agent, sent into their 'hive' to covertly destroy the aliens by shutting down the cooling system. This story was alluded to in a hidden section towards the end of level 14, where a large area, full of maroon tiles, can be found. The game was in development for 6 months by three people with a budget of $150,000.

== Release ==
Abuse was originally released on February 29, 1996, for MS-DOS and Linux, as an incomplete shareware version by Electronic Arts in North America, and Origin Systems in Europe. The game was ported to Mac OS by Oliver Yu of Crack dot Com and published by Bungie on March 5, 1997. The port was largely reworked for Mac, with the graphics partially redone to work better in 640x480 resolution. An AIX port published by IBM on September 26, 1996, is distributed via FTP.

=== Source code release ===
Approximately two years after the release of the game, Crack dot Com decided to release the game's source code. Also the shareware release's game data (excluding the sound effects) was handed into the public domain.

=== Community development ===
Based on the source release the game's community worked initially on maintenance work, e.g. making the game work over TCP/IP. In 2001 Abuse was adapted to SDL multimedia library, with other technical refinements such as more than the 8-bit color depth the original version was limited to.

The SDL version allowed easy porting to modern platforms, for instance Microsoft Windows, Linux/X11 and also the Mac version has been updated to run on OS X. Over the years, the game became available for many more platforms, for instance BeOS, Nintendo Wii via Wii homebrew, OpenBSD, and in 2009 AmigaOS 4. The game has also been ported to the mobile devices, to iPhone/iPod Touch under the name Abuse Classic.

Until 2011 the game was maintained by Sam Hocevar on his webpage. In 2014 the game was ported to SDL2 and transferred to a GitHub repository.

In 2016, on the 20th birthday of the game, a community developer released a "20th anniversary source port" on base of the previous works which enabled custom resolutions, OpenGL rendering, and Xbox 360 controller support, and fixed the music.

== Reception ==
Reception

Review scores
Publication	Score
Next Generation	4/5
Computer Game Review	86/100

Reviewing the DOS original, a Next Generation critic said the game "has everything it needs to be a great arcade classic – intuitive play control, a variety of weapons, creatures, devices, and traps ... scores of secrets to be ferreted out". He also praised the inclusion of an accessible level editor, and said the game's strongest point is the depth of its challenging puzzles, though he criticized the lack of story. He scored the game 4 out of 5 stars. The game was also reviewed in Computer Gaming World.

Abuse in its open-source version was selected in August 2011 as "HotPick" by Linux Format.
