= WINE@Etersoft =

Microsoft Windows compatibility layer

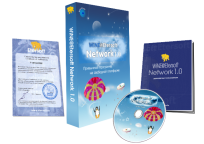
- Developer(s): Etersoft
- Operating system: Linux, FreeBSD
- Type: Compatibility layer
- License: Proprietary
- Website: etersoft.ru/wine

WINE@Etersoft is a Microsoft Windows compatibility layer available for Linux and FreeBSD. This compatibility layer enables many Windows-based applications to run on Linux operating systems, or FreeBSD.

WINE@Etersoft is developed by Etersoft and based on Wine, an open-source Windows compatibility layer. WINE@Etersoft is focused on popular Russian software applications as 1C:Enterprise, Consultant Plus, and Garant. Unlike regular Wine, it supports security keys and cryptography.

In 2008, the WINE@Etersoft software product won Russian prestigious award on technology category CNews AWARDS.

== Platforms ==
WINE@Etersoft supports many operating systems: Astra Linux, ALT Linux, Fedora Linux, Debian, Mandriva Linux, Slackware, openSUSE, FreeBSD, CentOS, Ubuntu, Red Hat Enterprise Linux.

== Applications ==
Lots of applications have been supported by the software at one time over the span of 16 years. Some still are supported by either the Etersoft company or Applications' developers. Some of the popular software: 1C:Enterprise, Consultant Plus, Garant, T-FLEX CAD, Kompas-3D, AVARDA, MetaTrader 4, QUIK.

== Education ==
There is a private use version of WINE@Etersoft named WINE@Etersoft Local that was once used in educational institutes between 2007 and 2010. In 2010, the WINE@Etersoft School product was released, distributed free of charge among Russian schools and focused on running educational applications on Linux. It was later replaced with the WINE@Etersoft Network Special Education License.

== See also ==
- Wine
- PlayOnMac
- PlayOnLinux
- Wine-Doors
- Darwine
