= Gorky Library (Ryazan) =

Public library in Ryazan, Russia

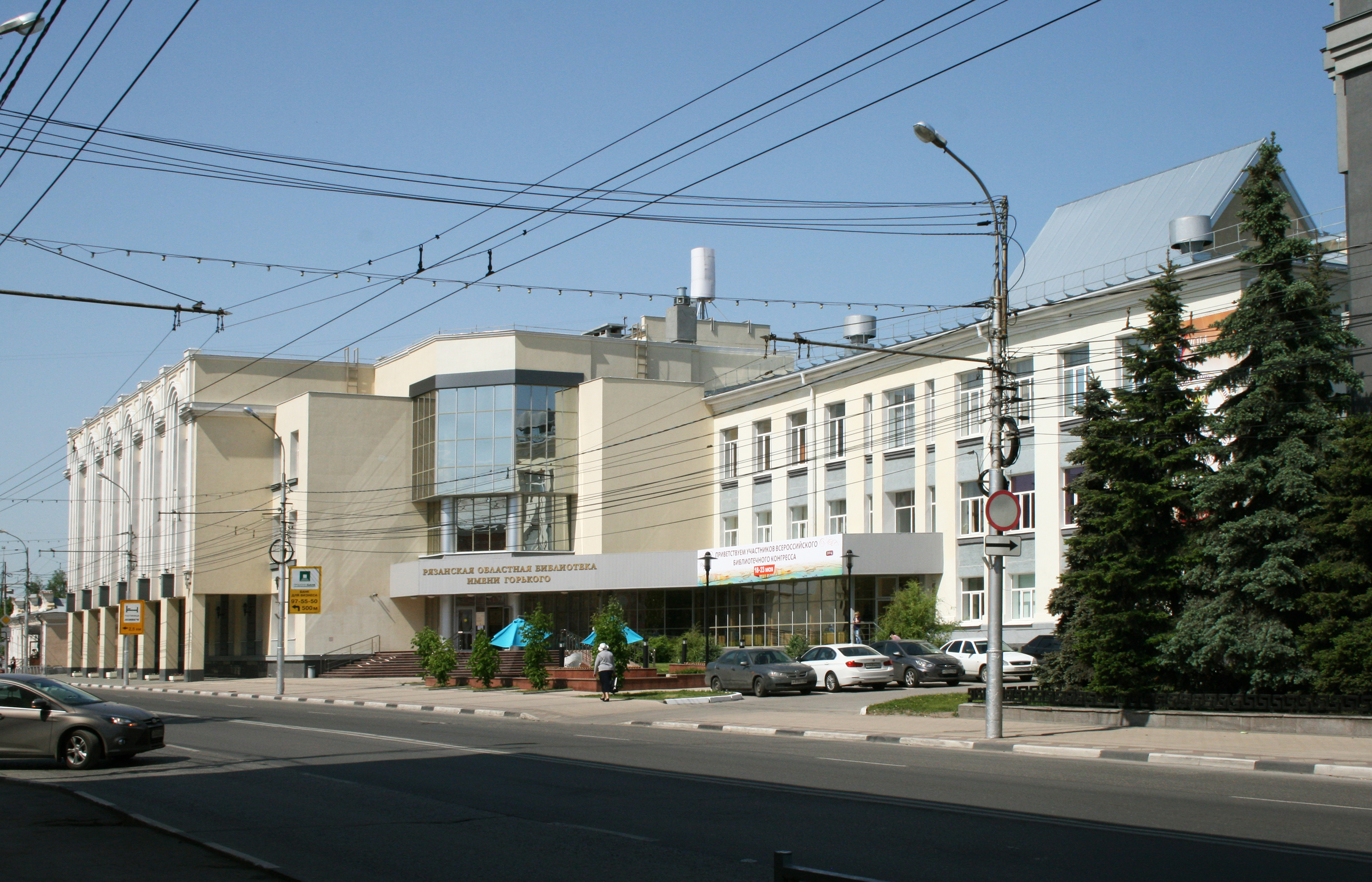
- Location: Ryazan, Ryazan Oblast, Russia
- Type: Public
- Established: 1858
- Branches: 2

Collection
- Size: 1,102,180

Access and use
- Circulation: 1.5 million (FY 2010)
- Population served: 240,090

Other information
- Director: Natalya Grishina
- Employees: about 220
- Website: http://rounb.ru (in Russian)

The Ryazan Oblast Universal Scientific Library (ROUNB) (est. 1858) is a central public library in Ryazan, Ryazan Oblast, Russia. It was one of the first public libraries in the country to offer open access to its holdings.

== History ==
=== Founding ===
In the 1830s the idea of public libraries was widely accepted in Russian society. However, due to financial straits, the first one in Ryazan was opened only in 1858.

The newspaper Ryazanskiye Gubernskiye Vedomosti (Russian: Рязанские губернские ведомости, literally "The Ryazan Guberniya Record") printed lists of donors. Among the founders of the Ryazan Public Library were the Ryazan gymnasium trustee, Nikolay Ryumin, the First guild merchant and fabulist Alexander Antonov and other well-known people.

The library was housed in the town center. The opening day collection consisted of 1,275 volumes and 4,300 periodicals. Use of the reading room was free, but subscription to the lending library cost 6 roubles per annum, 4 roubles per half-year and 1 rouble per month.

Among its members were the later Nobel laureate Ivan Pavlov, the Russian anti-Normanist historian Dmitry Ilovaysky, the Russian writer Nikolay Zlatovratsky and other famous people.

For some time, Mikhail Saltykov-Shchedrin, the great Russian novelist and philosopher, appointed in 1858 to the Vice Governor of Ryazan, was a member of the library board of trustees.

=== Soviet period ===
Through the several “mergers and acquisitions” after the October Revolution, the library holdings increased to above 40,000 items.

According to the decision of Ryazan City Council dated 31 March 1928, the library was named in honour of Maxim Gorky to mark the 60th anniversary of the writer's birth.

After Ryazan Oblast had been created in 1937, the Gorky library changed its status to an oblast library. In addition to the services that the library had been providing, since that year it developed new services (interlibrary loan, bibliographic indices and others). Its facilities were located at 24 Lenin Street, Ryazan, Ryazan Oblast.

Even though the Great Patriotic War started in 1941, the library continued to serve local people. Some of the staff were called up, while the others went to work in hospitals. In the meantime, the number of visitors was about 12,000 per year.

=== Turn of the twenty-first century ===
Since the 1990s, the ROUNB has taken part in different projects for library automation:

- 1992: the e-catalogue for local history was launched
- 1993: the ROUNB holdings e-catalogue was created
- 1996: the first website of the library was launched
- 1999: the Centre of Business and Law Information was founded, with free access to Consultant Plus, Garant and other useful resources.

== Gorky Library today ==
=== Location, access and facilities ===
==== Main building and branch ====
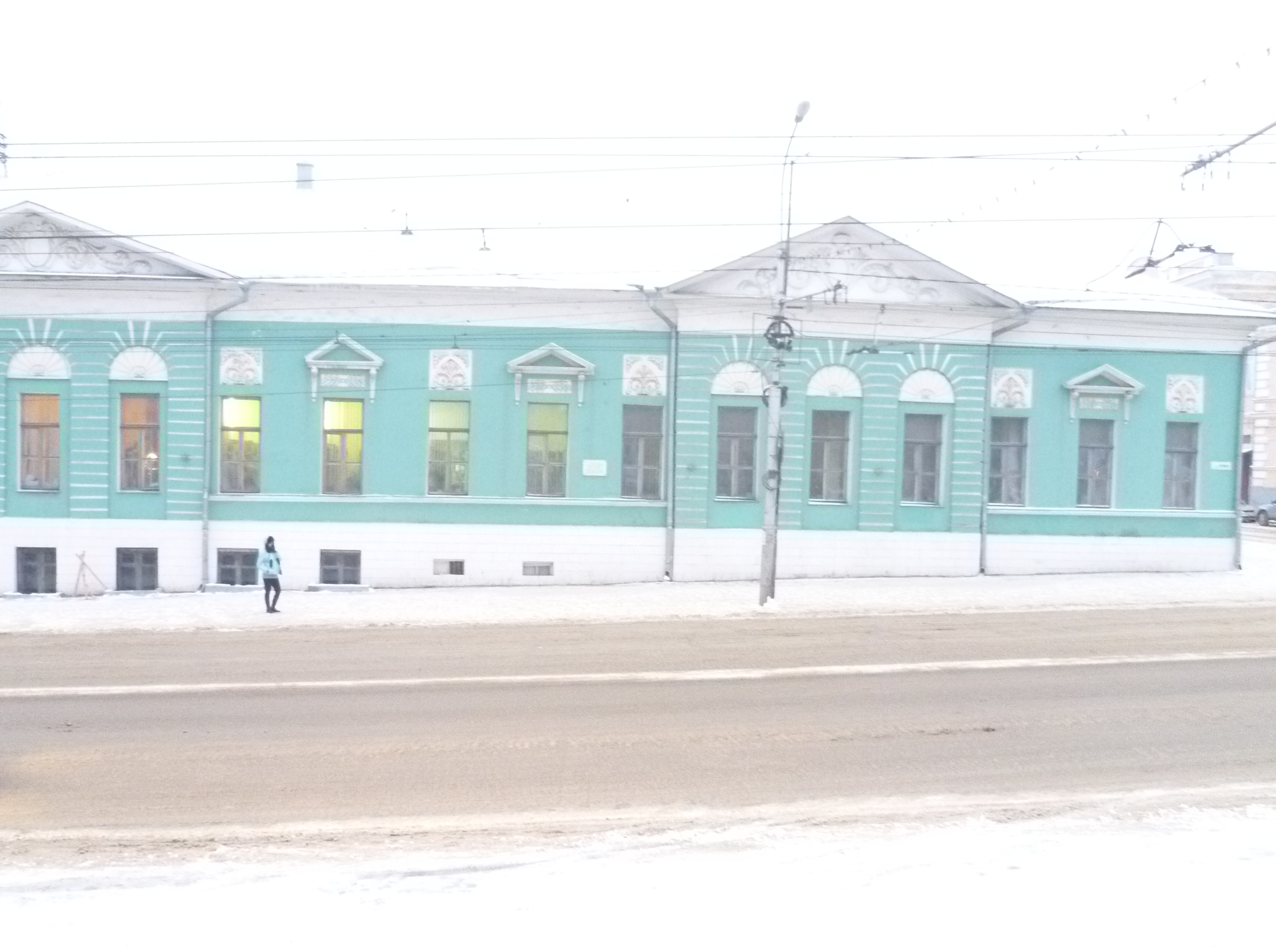
The ROUNB branch, on Nikolodvoryanskaya Street in Ryazan (winter 2012)

The main building consists of two wings. The first one was constructed in 1960-1964. Four years later, the monument to Gorky was erected within the building. The second wing, with modern interiors, was built in 2011.

The only branch of the ROUNB is situated close to the main building, at 24 Nikolodvoryanskaya Street, Ryazan.

=== Services and terms of use ===
==== Wi-Fi ====
All of the readers can use free wireless internet. The library members can also use the library laptops within its walls.

==== Website ====
The Gorky Library website provides access to the library's news and reviews, online catalogs and databases, and has information about the library's events, clubs and exhibitions. An OPAC system allows users to search the library's holdings of books, newspapers and other materials.

==== Facilities for people with physical disabilities ====
There are lifts and ramps for wheelchair users, to more easily access the library premises.

=== Clubs and societies ===
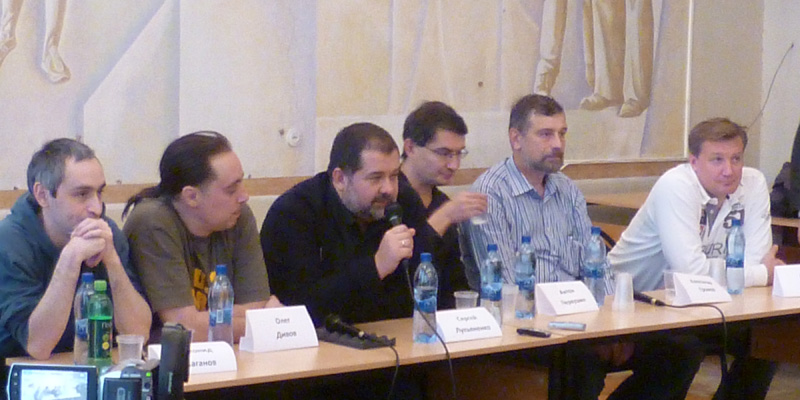
Fantasy and Science Fiction Fest 'Go on!' in Ryazan (2012). Alexander Gromov, Sergey Lukyanenko, Vadim Panov and other authors in the ROUNB.

==== Art lovers club ====
The Olympus (Art lovers club) meets regularly in the library since 1966. Among its guests were Yevgeny Nesterenko, Zurab Sotkilava and other well-known vocalists, poets, musical ensembles, composers, journalists.

==== Languages clubs ====
- Arabic
- Bengali
- English
- French
- Japanese
- Sanskrit
- Spanish

The lessons are free of charge.
