= CrossOver (software) =

Windows compatibility software

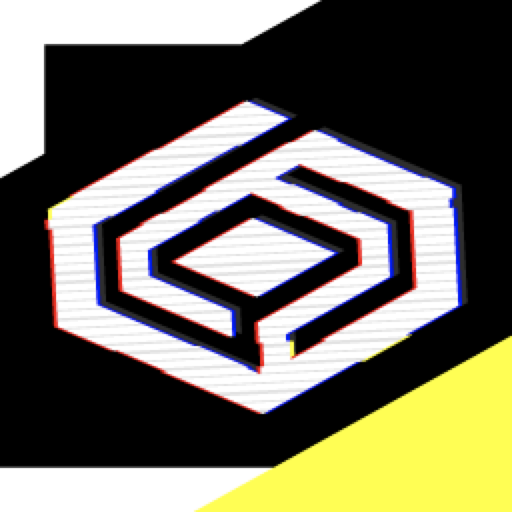
- Developer: CodeWeavers
- Release: 2002; 24 years ago
- Stable release: 26 / 10 February 2026; 8 months ago
- Operating system: Linux, macOS, ChromeOS
- Type: Compatibility layer
- License: Proprietary, GPL, LGPL
- Website: www.codeweavers.com/crossover/

CrossOver is a Microsoft Windows compatibility layer available for Linux, macOS, and ChromeOS. This compatibility layer enables many Windows-based applications to run on Linux operating systems, macOS, or ChromeOS.

CrossOver is developed by CodeWeavers and based on Wine, an open-source Windows compatibility layer. CodeWeavers modifies the Wine source code, applies compatibility patches, adds configuration tools that are more user-friendly, automated installation scripts, and provides technical support. All changes made to the Wine source code are covered by the LGPL and publicly available. CodeWeavers maintains an online database listing how well various Windows applications perform under CrossOver.

== History ==
The company was founded in 2000 with initial venture capital funding, which supported the exploration of various business models. Its flagship product, CrossOver Office, was launched in 2002. This application became the foundation for the entire CrossOver product line. Following the depletion of its initial funding, the company's financial viability became dependent on the commercial success of CrossOver. The product's revenue has since sustained the company and its ongoing development work on the Wine project. The organization acknowledges its user base as crucial to its continued operations.

== Versions ==
=== CrossOver Linux ===
CrossOver Linux is the original version of CrossOver. It aims to properly integrate with the GNOME and KDE desktop environments so that Windows applications will run seamlessly on Linux distributions. Before version 6, it was called CrossOver Office. CrossOver Linux was originally offered in Standard and Professional editions. CrossOver Linux Standard was designed for a single user account on a machine. CrossOver Linux Professional provided enhanced deployment and management features for corporate users and multiple user accounts per machine. With the release of CrossOver Linux 11 in 2012, these different editions merged into a single CrossOver Linux product.

=== CrossOver Mac ===
In 2005, Apple announced a transition from PowerPC to Intel processors in their computers, which allowed CodeWeavers to develop a Mac OS X version of CrossOver Office called 'CrossOver Mac'

CrossOver Mac was released on January 10, 2007. With the release of CrossOver Mac 7 on June 17, 2008, CrossOver Mac was divided into Standard and Pro editions like CrossOver Linux. The Standard version included six months of support and upgrades, while the Pro version included one year of support and upgrades, along with a bundled copy of CrossOver Games. With the release of CrossOver Mac 11 in 2012 these different editions were all merged into a single CrossOver Mac product.

In 2019, macOS Catalina went 64-bit only and eliminated support for 32-bit programs and libraries. In December 2019 Codeweavers released CrossOver 19, providing support for 32 bit Windows applications on an operating system with no 32 bit libraries solving this problem. The technique, known as "wine32on64", requires using modified LLVM to build additional thunk code that allows running 32-bit programs in a 64-bit wine.

In early June 2023, CodeWeavers announced early stages of DirectX 12 support on macOS would be available in CrossOver 23. At WWDC 2023, Apple announced the Game Porting Toolkit based on CrossOver to bring Windows games to macOS. Apple did not collaborate with CodeWeavers on this toolkit. In September 2023, CodeWeavers released version 23.5 of Crossover which supports D3DMetal from the Game Porting Toolkit as well as the GStreamer media framework.

=== Component's versions details ===
As example of the complexity of the final package:

Version	Date	Wine Version	Note	ref.
19.0.0	December 10, 2019	4.12		
20.0.0	October 13, 2020	5.0		
21.0.0	August 3, 2021	6.0	DXVK builtin (optional) v1.5, DXVK upstream (optional) v1.7	
21.1.0	November 29, 2021	6.3	DXVK builtin (optional) v1.5, DXVK upstream (optional) v1.7, Wine Mono 6.3	
21.2.0	March 22, 2022	6.3	DXVK builtin (optional) v1.5, DXVK upstream (optional) v1.7, Wine Mono 7.0	
22.0.0	August 23, 2022	7.0	VKD3D 1.3, DXVK builtin (optional) v1.5, DXVK upstream (optional) v1.8, Wine Mono 7.2, vkd3d 1.4, MoltenVK 1.1.10 for mac Os	
22.1.0	February 14, 2023	7.7	VKD3D 1.5, DXVK builtin (optional) v1.7, DXVK upstream (optional) v1.8	
23.0.0	August 16, 2023	8.0.1	Wine Mono 7.4.0, VKD3D 1.8, DXVK builtin (optional) v1.10.3, DXVK upstream (optional) v2.2, MoltenVK 1.2.3 for macOS	
24.0.0	February 22, 2024	9.0	Wine Mono 8.1.0, VKD3D 1.10, DXVK builtin (optional) v?, DXVK upstream (optional) v2.2, MoltenVK 1.2.5 for macOS	
25.0.0	March 11, 2025	10.0	Wine Mono 9.4.0, VKD3D 1.14, MoltenVK 1.2.10, D3DMetal 2.1, DXMT (Metal-based implementation of D3D11 on macOS)	
26.3.0	July 21, 2026	11.0	Wine Mono 10.4.1, vkd3d 1.18, D3DMetal 3.0, DXMT v0.72 for macOS	

=== Ongoing development ===
- On 6 November 2025 CodeWeavers announced a preview release which incorporates FEX-Emu to run x86 applications on ARM hardware.

== Discontinued products ==
A standard copy of CrossOver now includes the functionality of CrossOver Games, CrossOver Standard, and CrossOver Professional editions. These older individual versions of Crossover have since been retired.

CrossOver Games, announced on 10 March 2008, was a product intended to let users play a broad range of games by providing current Wine patches. The expectation was that it would update on a weekly to monthly schedule in order to incorporate the latest Wine programming work being accepted. In contrast the general CrossOver Office product focused more on stability and productivity software, and had a much slower beta and release schedule. CrossOver Games wasn't able to release updates with enough frequency to justify its separate production track and was discontinued in 2012. It was merged back into a unified CrossOver product.

CrossOver Server was a specialized version of CrossOver Linux which allowed Windows applications to run on thin-client systems. It was discontinued in 2007 as many of its features were present in the CrossOver Linux Pro edition.

== Software giveaway ==
On October 28, 2008 as the result of the Lame Duck Challenge, Codeweavers gave all of their products away. Codeweavers' main page was temporarily replaced due to the day's unusually high traffic. According to CodeWeavers at least 750,000 product registrations were given away during October 28.

On October 31, 2012, CodeWeavers had a second software giveaway, this one entitled "Flock the Vote". CodeWeavers promised to have such a giveaway if 100,000 American voters would promise to vote on election day, in a nonpartisan bid to encourage activism. More than 100,000 people pledged, so CodeWeavers allowed any person in the world to download and register a copy of CrossOver Linux or CrossOver Mac.

== See also ==
- Wine
- WINE@Etersoft
- PlayOnMac
- PlayOnLinux
- Wine-Doors
- Darwine
