= Anbox =

Software to run Android apps on Linux

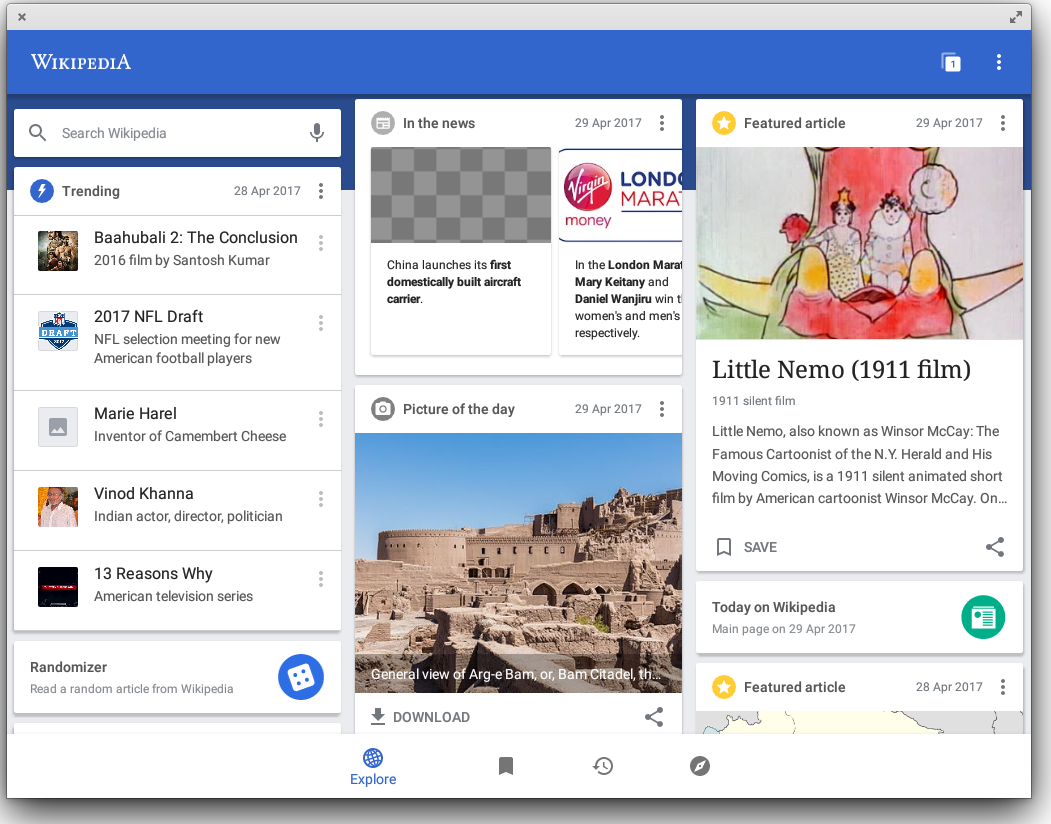
- Wikipedia application for Android running on Anbox
- Original authors: Marius Gripsgard, Ricardo Mendoza, Simon Fels, Thomas Voß
- Developers: Anbox authors (4)
- Release: 11 April 2017; 9 years ago
- Operating system: Linux
- Platform: x86-64, ARM, ARM64
- Type: Compatibility layer
- License: GNU GPL v3
- Website: anbox.io
- Repository: github.com/anbox/anbox

Anbox (short for “Android in a Box”) is a free and open-source compatibility layer that allows Android applications to run on Linux distributions by using containerization techniques. Originally introduced by Canonical, Anbox executes Android applications in a lightweight system container, isolated from the host system for security and efficiency.

Anbox was introduced as an early development version in April 2017 by developer Simon Fels. Initial work was carried out on an Ubuntu phone, and after Canonical's discontinuation of its phone and Ubuntu Touch efforts the project focused on desktop devices.

Anbox was deprecated on February 3, 2023 as it is no longer being actively maintained, as development has shifted to Waydroid (formerly called Anbox-Halium).

Canonical's active development focus shifted to Anbox Cloud, a platform for running Android applications in a cloud environment. Anbox Cloud is a closed-source, enterprise-focused version of the original Anbox, maintained by Canonical, offering extended features, better scalability, and support via Ubuntu Pro.

== How Anbox works ==
Anbox executes the Android runtime environment by using LXC (Linux Containers), recreating the directory structure of Android as a mountable loop image, while using native Linux kernel to execute applications. It makes use of Linux namespaces through LXC for isolation. Applications do not have any direct hardware access, all accesses are sent through the Anbox daemon. This ensures that Android apps can run on Linux without the need for emulation, offering improved performance compared to traditional methods like Android emulators.

== How Anbox Cloud differs from Anbox ==
Anbox Cloud is a cloud-based platform developed by Canonical for running Android operating system instances at scale. It builds on container-based virtualization using LXD to enable multiple isolated Android environments on a single machine.

Unlike the original Anbox project, which was desktop-oriented and is now discontinued, Anbox Cloud is intended for deployment in server and cloud infrastructures. It supports both Arm and x86 architectures, offers GPU acceleration for graphics-intensive workloads such as cloud gaming, and includes tooling for automation, orchestration, and performance monitoring.

Anbox Cloud is compatible with public cloud providers such as AWS, Azure, and Google Cloud Platform, as well as private and hybrid cloud environments. Anbox Cloud supports elastic scaling and centralized management, and is used for mobile application testing, CI/CD pipelines, low-latency Android streaming, and the development of in-vehicle software based on Android Automotive OS, including support for the Vehicle Hardware Abstraction Layer (VHAL). It is suited for use cases requiring high instance density, secure isolation, and consistent performance.

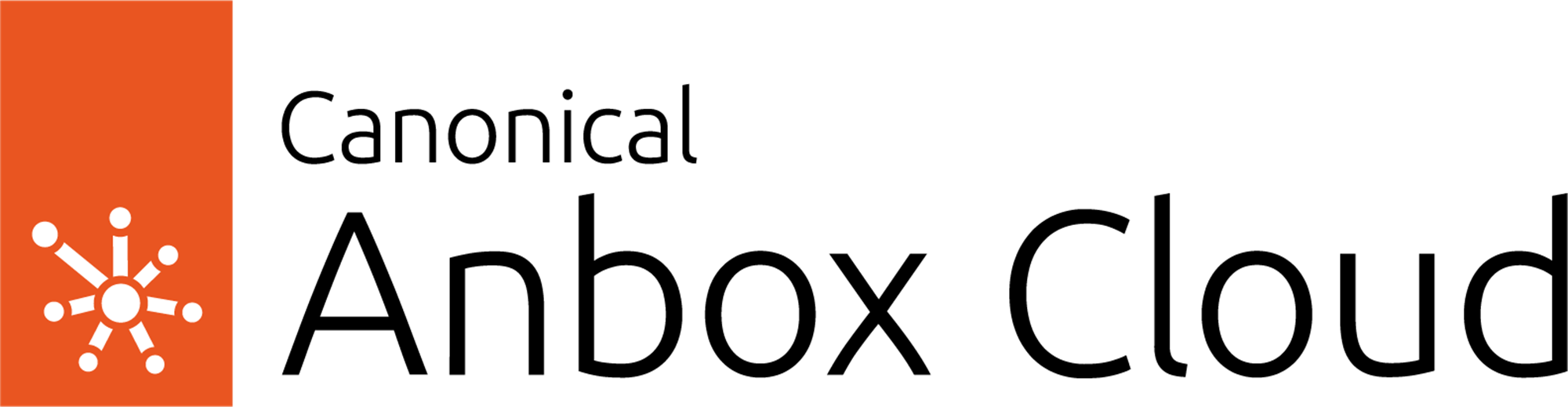
Anbox Cloud logo

== Architecture ==
Anbox places the Android system in a container and abstracts hardware access, integrating core Android services into a GNU/Linux system. Rather than running a separate kernel as an emulator or virtual machine would, it runs Android on the host's own Linux kernel. The container is isolated using Linux namespaces (user, pid, uts, net, mount and ipc), and the Android system inside it has no direct hardware access: all hardware requests go through the Anbox daemon on the host. Graphics use the OpenGL ES hardware-accelerated rendering code developed for the Android QEMU-based emulator, with requests sent from the container to the host over pipes.

Running Anbox requires the ashmem and binder Android kernel modules on the host, which early releases provided through an installer and a DKMS package, and root access. The runtime itself was distributed as a snap package. The bundled Android system image was a customized build of the Android Open Source Project based on Android 7.1.1.

Anbox does not include the Google Play store, which depends on proprietary Google Play Services. Applications are instead installed from the command line with the Android Debug Bridge (adb install) or through an alternative store such as F-Droid; APK files that only contain 32-bit ARM code do not work on x86-64 hosts. The project officially supported Ubuntu 18.04 and 20.04, with other distributions supporting snap packages expected to work if they provided the required kernel support.

== Discontinuation ==
The project's README states that development stalled over the years and that, as of 2023, Anbox was no longer actively developed; the existing repositories were left as they were, with no further maintenance planned. It points users wanting Android on a Linux desktop to Waydroid, and users wanting Android in the cloud to Canonical's Anbox Cloud. The main GitHub repository was archived by its owner on 13 February 2024 and is read-only.

== Anbox Cloud ==
Anbox Cloud is a Canonical product that runs Android applications at scale on cloud platforms. It uses system containers or virtual machines to host nested Android containers, and Juju for deployment, and is available for x86 and Arm64 hardware. Its container layer is built on LXD, and a cluster of machines is managed through the Anbox Management Service (AMS), with an Anbox Application Registry for distributing applications; the application registry was fully supported by version 1.2.0 (April 2019). Support for creating virtual machine instances alongside containers was introduced in version 1.20.0 (2023). Starting with version 1.23.0, its documentation was moved to Canonical's documentation site.

== See also ==
- Android-x86 - An open source project that makes an unofficial porting of Google's Android mobile operating system to run on devices powered by AMD and Intel x86 processors, rather than RISC-based ARM chips.
- BlueStacks has developed an App Player for Windows and MacOS capable of running Android applications in a container.
- The SPURV compatibility layer is a similar project developed by Collabora.
- Waydroid also uses Android (LineageOS) in an LXC container on a regular Linux system, using Wayland.
- Wine - A Windows compatibility layer for Unix-like systems.
