= Employee ownership trust =

Type of shareholding

An employee ownership trust (EOT) holds a permanent or long-term shareholding in a company on trust for the benefit of all the company's employees. An EOT provides indirect (trust) employee ownership of a company.

Among the different forms of employee ownership, the trust model may, in particular, be chosen instead of employees owning shares directly because it can be used to organise an employee buy-out, without requiring finance from employees, provides a long-term ownership model and is straightforward to administer.

This trust model of employee ownership has been promoted since 2012 by the UK Government and is now the main form of employee ownership in the UK. The EOT ownership model is also recognised in the United States (where it may be labelled differently, such as perpetual trust or steward-ownership trust) as an alternative to the ESOP.

== The trust model of employee ownership ==
There are three basic forms of employee ownership:

- Direct Ownership of shares by all employees as individuals;
- Indirect Ownership on behalf of all employees by the trustee of an employee trust; and
- The Hybrid Model, which combines both direct and indirect ownership.

An EOT is a form of indirect ownership in which the trustee of the EOT holds shares in a permanent or long-term trust on behalf of all employees. The EOT can also be used in a hybrid model, that is, where the EOT has a shareholding, held alongside employees as individual shareholders (and/or possibly other investors). The EOT shareholding must act in conjunction with an organisational structure that ensures employee engagement within the relevant company (or group) for the company to have employee ownership.

== Use ==
An employee ownership business model is a way of achieving benefits for a business, its employees, and society. The trust model has the following characteristics in comparison to employee ownership models involving direct employee share ownership:

- it can be used to finance a transition to employee ownership using contributions from the business itself, rather than from individual employees;
- it provides a stable and long-term structure for employee ownership including a vehicle, the EOT, that looks after the best interests of both present and future employees and facilitates giving employees a collective "voice"; and
- it makes the tax and overall administrative procedures more straightforward than operating individual employee share (or share option) plans.

Research in EOT owned companies showed higher scores in the values of fairness, trust, excellence, humility, and courage among employees, with no significant differences between seniority levels. Research into EOT owned companies also shows that employee ownership works well to meet the aspirations of the millennial generation, and reveals that millennials value many characteristics of the employee ownership business model, such as profit sharing and personal development, more than previous generations did.

== In Canada ==
The Employee Ownership Trust in Canada was introduced through federal legislation in 2024, following advocacy by employee ownership proponents. The Budget Implementation Act 2024 (Bill C-59) established a tax framework offering business owners a capital gains tax exemption of up to $10 million on qualifying sales to an EOT.[1] This exemption is currently temporary, set to expire at the end of 2026 unless extended by Parliament.

=== Advocacy and Legislative Development ===
Social Capital Partners, a Toronto-based impact investing organization, led the early advocacy for EOT legislation in Canada, publishing their foundational report Building an Employee Ownership Economy in October 2020. Shortly afterwards, they were joined by Rewrite Capital Advisors. Jon Shell, Chair of Social Capital Partners, and Tiara Letourneau, CEO of Rewrite Capital Advisors, co-founded the Canadian Employee Ownership Coalition, which advocated for a Canadian EOT framework modeled on the successful US ESOP and UK EOT legislation.

The Coalition's efforts resulted in the federal government announcing its intention to create an EOT framework in the 2023 Federal Budget, with further details and the $10 million capital gains exemption announced in the Fall Economic Statement 2023. The legislation received Royal Assent in June 2024 through Bill C-59 (EOT framework) and Bill C-69 (capital gains exemption).

=== Tax Framework ===
The Canadian EOT framework provides two key tax incentives for business owners who sell to an EOT:

A capital gains tax exemption of up to $10 million on qualifying sales to an EOT, available for transactions occurring in the 2024, 2025, and 2026 tax years. This exemption is on a per-transaction basis, can only be used at the time of the formation of the EOT, and can be shared among multiple sellers. It can also be used in conjunction with the Lifetime Capital Gains Exemption.

An extended capital gains reserve period of 10 years (compared to the standard 5 years), allowing sellers to defer recognition of capital gains as payments are received over time.

The EOT capital gain tax exemption is set to expire at the end of 2026. Employee Ownership Canada and advocates continue to campaign to make the exemption permanent.

=== Early Adoption ===
Grantbook, a Toronto-based consultancy serving the philanthropic sector, became the first Canadian company to complete a sale to a domestic Employee Ownership Trust on January 1, 2025. The transaction was completed with support from Rewrite Capital Advisors, Bennett Jones LLP, and Sue Lawrence.

In September 2025, Taproot Community Support Services, a Maple Ridge, B.C.-based social services organization, became Canada's largest EOT with 750 employees across British Columbia, Alberta, and Ontario. It was also the first company to be 100% owned by an EOT and the first EOT in Canada's social services sector. The transaction was supported by Rewrite Capital Advisors, with Clark Wilson LLP serving as legal counsel.

As the legislation only received Royal Assent in June 2024, adoption remains in its early stages. Industry observers expect EOT transactions to multiply as awareness grows among business owners and their advisors, particularly given the temporary nature of the $10 million capital gains exemption.

See also: [Employee Ownership Trusts in Canada]

== In the United Kingdom ==
The EOT was promoted by the UK Government (along with other types of employee ownership) in the years following the 2012 Nuttall Review of Employee Ownership. The EOT was recognised in UK tax law in 2014 when tax exemptions were introduced to encourage its use. The Nuttall Review and the EOT tax exemptions have helped increase the number of UK employee-owned companies.

In the 2024 Autumn Budget, the UK government introduced changes impacting Employee Ownership Trusts (EOTs). Key reforms include tighter regulations preventing former owners from retaining control post-sale, mandates for UK-resident trustees, and an extension of the relief clawback period. Additionally, capital gains tax (CGT) on share disposals and Business Asset Disposal Relief (BADR) rates are set to rise. These changes aimed to enhance EOTs as a succession model by ensuring fair tax practices and promoting genuine employee engagement.

=== Nuttall review of employee ownership ===
The UK has a long history of employee ownership in various forms, including the trust model. In 2012, Graeme Nuttall was appointed as the UK Government's independent adviser on employee ownership to "work with Government to identify the barriers to employee ownership and help find the solutions to knock them down". The resulting Nuttall Review advocated, in particular, the merits of employee ownership through a trust, which provides a long-term structure and one suited to achieving employee engagement and to supporting employee buyouts. The Nuttall Review supported tax changes to raise awareness of employee ownership and contained various recommendations which were broadly supported by the Government. Graeme Nuttall worked with HM Treasury regarding possible new tax incentives.

In Autumn 2012, HM Treasury and HM Revenue and Customs confirmed support for implementing the Government's response to the Nuttall Review and that the Government was considering further incentives to support this objective. The Government recognised that a range of employee ownership models may be legitimately applied, including employee benefit trusts that are not aimed at avoiding tax.

In 2013, the Government announced that following the findings of the Nuttall Review, it had decided to introduce two tax reliefs to encourage, promote and support indirect employee ownership structures. These exemptions would go some way towards supporting existing and newly created indirect employee ownership structures in the same way that tax advantaged employee share plans already encourage direct employee share ownership. The tax reliefs also promote awareness of the sector and increased the attractiveness of indirect employee ownership structures for businesses which might be considering converting.

=== Finance Act 2014 ===
The UK Finance Act 2014 created a definition of an EOT for UK tax purposes. This definition limits the discretion of the EOT's trustee. The EOT must not permit:

- any property in the trust to be applied otherwise than for the benefit of all employees of the relevant company and any group companies (subject to some limited exceptions) on the same terms (see further below);
- the trustee of the EOT to apply any trust property:
  - by creating a new trust; or
  - by transferring property to the trustee of any settlement other than, broadly, another EOT;
- the trustee to make loans to any beneficiaries; or
- the terms of the EOT to be amended in such a way as to permit any of the above.

The Finance Act 2014 also introduced:

- a complete exemption from capital gains tax arising in connection with the sale of shares to an EOT, so as to give the trustee a controlling interest in a company, and
- an income tax (but not national insurance contributions) exemption for certain discretionary bonuses of up to £3,600 per employee per tax year paid to employees of a company (or group) controlled by an EOT.

There are a number of conditions to be satisfied in order for these exemptions to apply.

=== Equality requirement ===
A key requirement for a trust to qualify as a UK EOT is that it meets the "equality requirement". Prior to the Finance Act 2014, an employee trust (even one used for employee ownership purposes) would usually be drafted so as to meet certain less onerous requirements in the Inheritance Act (1984) relating to employee trusts (especially section 86). Under such employee trusts a trustee may make a distribution on bespoke terms to a selected beneficiary, whilst, in contrast, an EOT requires all eligible employees to benefit from any distributions on "same terms". This means EOT beneficiaries must either all receive an equal amount, or their benefit may vary by reference to their remuneration, length of service, or hours worked.

A similar concept applies to income tax free employee bonuses. All individuals employed by the employer or another group company must be eligible to participate and (subject to limited possible exceptions) must all participate on the same terms.

=== Effect of introducing the EOT in the UK ===
The Nuttall Review and EOT tax changes have stimulated wider interest in employee ownership. Some existing employee-owned firms have changed their ownership structure to incorporate an EOT. Added together newly created EOTs and deemed EOTs (pre-existing employee trusts that meet certain requirements), now represent more than three quarters of companies in the UK employee ownership sector and over half the total number of employees.

== EOTs in the US ==
There is some use of EOTs in the US.

In 2014, the international design firm Wimberly Allison Tong & Goo (WATG) became the first US company to create employee ownership through an English EOT. WATG decided against a sale to an ESOP. Leadership wanted to avoid the cost and time requirements of creating and maintaining an ESOP, including legal work, administration, and valuation. They also wanted to avoid simply replacing their repurchase obligation from existing buy-sell agreements with an ESOP repurchase obligation.

In 2017, an Ann Arbor company, Arbor Assays, also became owned by an English EOT. This method of employee ownership was adopted to maintain the company perpetually for the benefit of its employees. Financially, the employees will benefit because, in addition to their basic pay, the company will annually allocate revenue not needed for company operations or future investment to participating employees.

In 2022, Clegg Auto, a group of four Utah-based auto repair and body shops, established the first EOT owning multiple subsidiaries, financed by Common Trust. In just a year after transitioning to employee ownership, the businesses announced a doubling in profits.

In 2023, the Texas-based messaging company Text-Em-All became the first SaaS company in the US to move to an EOT. The founders specifically wanted to cement the long-term vision of the company so that it could continue to benefit customers, employees, and the community.

Other US companies have also moved to this form of trust ownership using trusts established under domestic trust laws including:

- ACP International (2022), first EOT in Texas.
- Equity Atlas (2016), first EOT finance company in the US.
- Metis Construction Inc (2016) Based in Seattle, WA, Metis converted to an EOT in February 2016.
- Organically Grown Company (2018)
- Paras and Associates (2019)
- Berrett-Koehler Publishers (2020)
- ShopBot Tools (2021), first EOT in North Carolina.
- CodeWeavers (2023)

== EOTs in Australia ==
Employee Ownership Australia is working to introduce the EOT model to Australia.
