= Waydroid =

Software container system for Android

- Website: waydro.id
- Repository: github.com/waydroid/waydroid

Waydroid is a container-based compatibility layer that enables Android to run in a containerized environment on non-Android Linux-based operating systems. By using Linux namespaces, Waydroid keeps Android isolated but allows it to access the host system's hardware. Built on a customized version of LineageOS, it enables Android applications to function alongside desktop Linux applications on conventional desktop and laptop personal computers and other non-Android Linux-based mobile devices.

== Overview ==
Waydroid utilizes Linux namespaces and a system image based on LineageOS. The software requires use of the Wayland display protocol, although it can run under X11 via a Wayland compositor like Cage or Weston. Waydroid does not include a processor emulation layer, meaning it can only run software that was compiled for the CPU architecture of the host device.

Waydroid was created to facilitate the use of Android apps on Linux-based platforms. It is based on ideas from previous projects, such as Anbox, which also aimed to run Android using containerization techniques. Although primarily developed for Halium-based Linux phones, Waydroid is compatible with any device using a Linux kernel.

== Forks ==
In 2024, it was reported that Valve Corporation had been using Waydroid as part of a future Steam component similar to its Proton layer for Windows games, running on 64-bit ARM architecture. The following year, Valve unveiled its new SteamOS-based virtual reality headset Steam Frame, which includes an Android runtime environment to target VR software developed for headsets such as Meta Quest. The layer was later revealed to be named "Lepton".

== See also ==
- Windows Subsystem for Android
- Wine (software)
