= Alexandre Julliard =

Swiss computer programmer (born 1970)

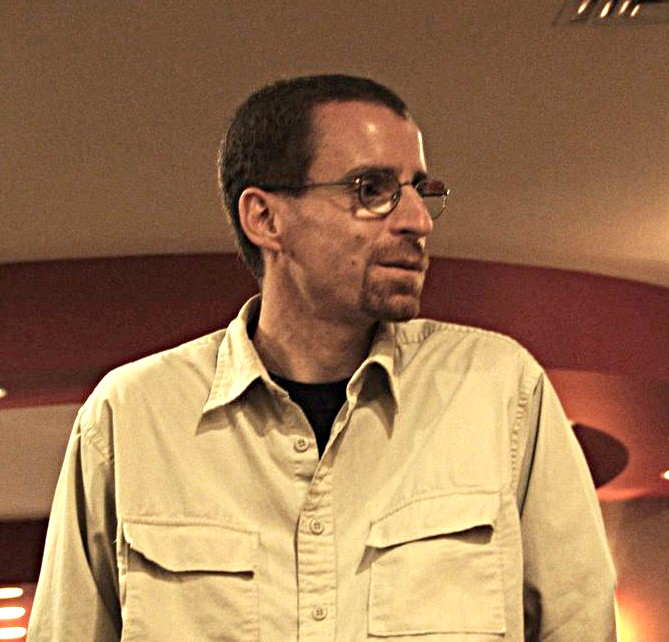
- Alexandre Julliard at Wineconf, 28 September 2009.
- Born: 1970 (age 55–56)
- Occupations: Programmer; Project leader of Wine

Alexandre Julliard (born 1970) is a computer programmer who is best known as the project leader for Wine, a compatibility layer to run Microsoft Windows programs on Unix-like operating systems.

Julliard studied computer science at the Swiss Federal Institute of Technology in Lausanne. He spent most of the 1990s working on embedded systems. He now works full-time on Wine for CodeWeavers.

Julliard enjoys astronomy and lives in Lausanne, Switzerland.
