= Cycada (compatibility layer) =

Allows iOS software to run on Android

- Original authors: Jeremy Andrus (formerly); Alexander Van’t Hof; Naser AlDuaij; Christoffer Dall; Nicolas Viennot; Jason Nieh
- Developers: Department of Computer Science, Columbia University
- Operating system: Android
- Type: Compatibility layer
- Website: systems.cs.columbia.edu/projects/cycada/

Cycada (formerly known as Cider, and Chameleon before) is a compatibility layer that aims to allow applications designed for iOS to run unmodified on the Android operating system. The method uses compile-time adaptation to run unmodified code with minimal implementation effort.

The project was revealed in a conference paper by computer science researchers at Columbia University. The project enables iOS applications to adapt to Android's kernel and programming libraries.

A video released shows that many applications work, including the iOS version of Yelp, Apple's iBooks software and 3D benchmarks using OpenGL. Consequent to the release of the white paper, hardware GPS support was added to the software.

Unlike many other compatibility layers (such as WINE or Darling), Cycada works at the kernel level, as opposed to at user space.

Cycada is not a simple APK file, and modifies the entire Linux kernel.

It is unknown whether the project will be released.

The original name “Cider” was most likely a play on both WINE, another compatibility layer named after an alcoholic drink, and on how actual cider is made using apples, making a pun on Apple

Since lead developer Jeremy Andrus left for a job on the Darwin kernel at Apple, the project has been headed by Jason Nieh. Work on the project has still continued following this related to graphics in 2017.

== Similar projects ==
1. In December 2022, Internet user Martijn de Vos, also known as devos50 has reverse engineered this device to successfully create a QEMU emulation of this device, running iPhone OS 1.0.
2. touchHLE is a compatibility layer (referred to as a “high-level emulator”) for Windows and macOS made by Andrea "hikari_no_yume" in early 2023. It uses code translation along with CPU emulation when necessary, and specifically stated that the developer does not want to be compatible with 64 bit software.
3. ipasim is a compatibility layer that provides native execution for iOS apps to run on Windows based on code translations and WinObjC.
4. QEMU-t9080, also known as TruEmu is an iPhone 11 emulated in QEMU for the purpose of security research and cannot boot past the Apple Logo.

== See also ==
- WinObjC

== Notes ==
1.Cider is an alcoholic drink made from apples.
