= PlayOnMac =

Free compatibility layer and emulator for macOS

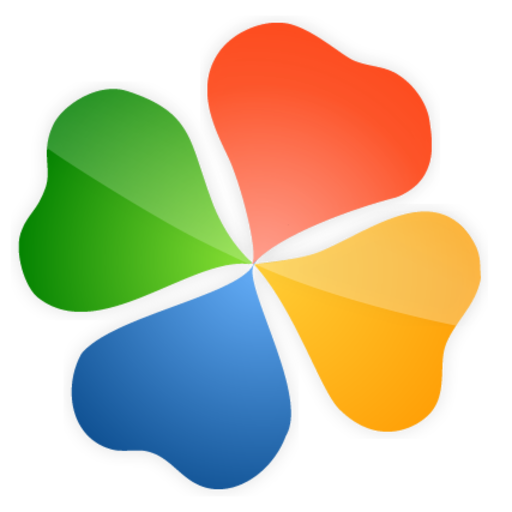
- Developer: Quentin Pâris
- Repository: github.com/PlayOnLinux/POL-POM-4
- Operating system: macOS
- Type: Compatibility layer/emulator
- License: GPL, LGPL
- Website: playonmac.com

PlayOnMac is a free compatibility layer and emulator for macOS that allows installation and usage of video games and other software initially designed to run exclusively on Microsoft Windows. PlayOnMac is based on the open-source Wine project and therefore creates and uses virtual drives much like Wineskin wrappers (the virtual drives are essentially Wineskin wrappers operating on a particular version of Wine).

Furthermore, it uses an online database of installers (called scripts) that are applied to different applications that need special configuration. The scripts act as installers for the desired software. If the video game or software that must be installed is not in the online database of PlayOnMac, a manual installation can be performed but the positive result cannot be guaranteed.

Aside from video games, any other program can be installed and each one is put in a different container to prevent interference of one program with another. Therefore, PlayOnMac allows users to install some of the most popular Windows programs and many video games as well.

As with Wine, the use of PlayOnMac does not require nor use a Windows license.

Lastly, PlayOnMac has been developed using a combination of two programming languages, more specifically Bash and Python. In addition, it also uses the wrapper/toolkit wxPython.

== See also ==
- WINE@Etersoft
- Parallels Desktop for Mac
- CrossOver (software)
- Darwine
- PlayOnLinux
- Wine (software)
- Wine-Doors
