= LINA (software) =

- Developer(s): Lina Software
- Stable release: 1.00 beta1 / October 15, 2009; 15 years ago
- Written in: C, C++, Python
- Operating system: Windows, Mac OS X
- Type: Compatibility layer
- License: GNU General Public License v2
- Website: www.openlina.com (inactive) (archived version)

LINA was a piece of open-source software that enabled users to run applications compiled for Linux under Windows and Mac OS X with a native look and feel. Version 1.00 beta1 was released in October 2009 and was available at the Open Lina web site. However, that domain is now up for sale.

== Release ==
The latest binary version, still a beta, was released on October 15, 2009. As the tool was open sourced under the terms of the GNU General Public License v2, its source code had been made available since July 19, 2007.

== See also ==
- Compatibility layer
