= CodeWeavers =

American software company

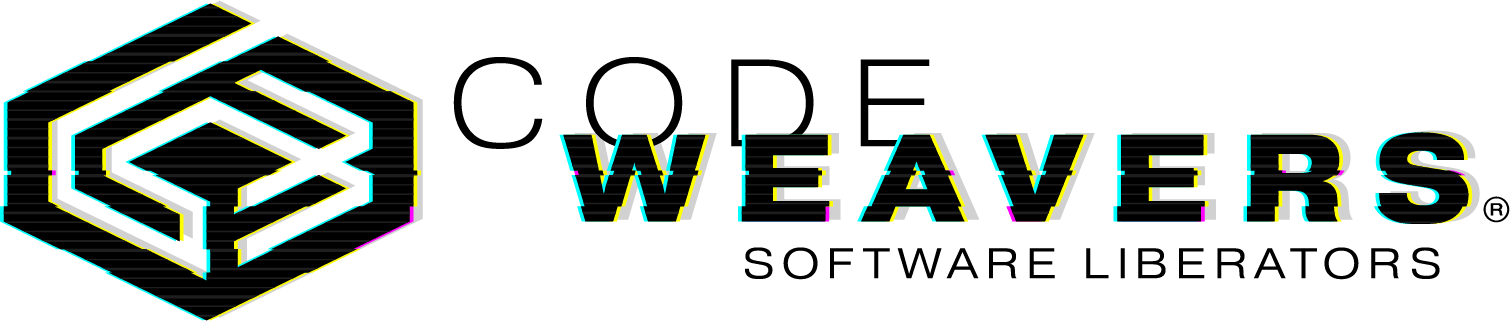
- Type: Private
- Industry: Computer software
- Founded: 1996; 30 years ago
- Headquarters: Saint Paul, Minnesota, United States
- Key people: Jeremy White (Founder and Chairman of the Board); Alexandre Julliard (CTO); James Ramey (CEO)
- Products: CrossOver Mac; CrossOver Linux; Proton; PortJump; ExecMode
- Number of employees: 45
- Website: www.codeweavers.com

CodeWeavers is a software company that focuses on Wine development and sells a proprietary version of Wine called CrossOver for running Windows applications on macOS, ChromeOS and Linux. The company was founded in 1996 as a consultancy, eventually moving entirely over to Wine development and support.

CodeWeavers is the principal corporate sponsor of the Wine project, hosts Wine's website, helps sponsor the Wine conference, employs many Wine developers, and is a major code contributor to Wine. CodeWeavers claims that two-thirds of all commits to Wine come from their developers. The company also employs Wine's primary maintainer, Alexandre Julliard, as its CTO. While CodeWeavers' main commercial interest in Wine is its use in the Crossover product, they also encourage enhancements to Wine that sometimes compete with Crossover.

CodeWeavers also employs some developers of wine-mono, an open-source reimplementation of Microsoft .NET framework (4.x and earlier) which is intended as a replacement for the .NET Framework in Wine. Wine-mono is a branch of Mono which has been tailored to work with Wine.

Since 2016, CodeWeavers has been contracted to work with Valve on Proton, a compatibility layer for running Windows games through Steam on Linux.

CodeWeavers is a founding member of the Desktop Linux Consortium.

CodeWeavers' products and services include CrossOver, PortJump, and ExecMode.

In April 2023, CodeWeavers transitioned to an employee ownership trust. Jeremy White stepped down as CEO and company president James Ramey assumed the role.

== CrossOver ==
For CrossOver, the company originally focused on making the Microsoft Office suite and other supported productivity software available on Linux. When Apple switched to Intel processors in 2006 CodeWeavers was able to create CrossOver Mac and bring Wine to Mac OS X. Other major supported applications include the financial software Quicken and the Steam game client.

Former products include CrossOver Plugin, CrossOver Server and CrossOver Games. Plugin was made to run browser plugins such as Flash and ActiveX in Linux. CrossOver Server was a product designed for multi-user environments. CrossOver Games was introduced in March 2008 and was intended to allow gaming-related patches from Wine to be incorporated into CrossOver much faster. In 2012 all versions have had the server, plugin, and games functionality merged into the primary CrossOver products.

== PortJump ==
CodeWeavers provides porting services (known as PortJump) around Wine. Google has paid CodeWeavers to improve support for Adobe Photoshop and add functionality to Wine.

== ExecMode ==
CodeWeavers provides consulting services (known as ExecMode). These services revolve around writing open-source code for enterprise level clients. The main difference from PortJump is that these services do not use Wine, but instead focus on other open-source technologies.

== Great American Lame Duck Presidential Challenge ==
In July 2008, CodeWeavers launched the Great American Lame Duck Presidential Challenge to encourage President Bush to make the most of his remaining days in office by accomplishing a major economic or political goal by January 20, 2009.

The goals focused on President Bush making specific positive accomplishments in areas such as the economy, home values, the stock market, the war on terror and other key issues. Specifically, one goal called for President Bush to help bring down average gasoline prices in the Twin Cities to $2.79 a gallon.

On October 14, gas prices in Minneapolis and St. Paul fell to $2.79 a gallon, and CodeWeavers honored their pledge giving away their software for no charge on October 28, 2008. Traffic via Slashdot, Digg, and other sources overloaded and brought down the CodeWeavers website as people rushed to get the free-of-charge software. According to CodeWeavers, "You will be able to unlock your serial number that was emailed to you for an extended time, (an additional 48 hours), due to this downtime. We will simply stop giving out new serial numbers at 23:59 (Midnight) Central Standard Time."

Additionally, CodeWeavers updated their site to reflect the statement: "Please check back again for registration code information later today. We will be deploying a streamlined serial code generation process shortly." At the same time, they also added an "about Wine" paragraph.

The streamlined process came to pass, but customers were told to expect to wait "several days" to receive their serial number. In the interim, fully unlocked (full builds) of four different CodeWeavers packages became available for immediate download, but only on October 28, 2008.
