= LXD =

LXD may refer to:

- LXD Incorporated, a manufacturer of LCD screens
- The Legion of Extraordinary Dancers, a 2010–11 web series about two groups of rival dancers
- LXD, a system container manager, a tool for LXC, an operating-system-level virtualization method
