= Cross-platform virtualization =

Type of computer virtualisation

Cross-platform virtualization is a form of computer virtualization that allows software compiled for a specific instruction set and operating system to run unmodified on computers with different CPUs and/or operating systems, through a combination of dynamic binary translation and operating system call mapping.

Since the software runs on a virtualized equivalent of mapping imposes a performance penalty, when compared to natively-compiled software. For this reason, cross-platform virtualization may be used as a temporary solution until resources are available to port the software. Alternatively, cross-platform virtualization may be used to support legacy code, which running on a newer and faster machine still maintains adequate performance even with virtualization overhead.

By creating an abstraction layer capable of running software compiled for a different computer system, cross-platform virtualization characterizes the Popek and Goldberg virtualization requirements outlined by Gerald J. Popek and Robert P. Goldberg in their 1974 article "Formal Requirements for Virtualizable Third Generation Architectures". Cross-platform virtualization is distinct from simple emulation and binary translation - which involve the direct translation of one instruction set to another - since the inclusion of operating system call mapping provides a more complete virtualized environment. Cross-platform virtualization is also complementary to server virtualization and desktop virtualization solutions, since these are typically constrained to a single instruction set, such as x86 or Power ISA. Modern variants of cross-platform virtualisation may employ hardware acceleration techniques to offset some of the cost incurred in the guest-to-host system.

== See also ==
- Instruction set simulator
- Platform virtualization
- Virtual machine
- Emulator
- Porting
- Cross-platform
