= Dynamic Kernel Module Support =

Linux kernel framework

- Original author: Gary Lerhaupt
- Developer: Dell
- Release: 2003; 23 years ago
- Stable release: 3.4.1 / May 8, 2026; 6 months ago
- Written in: Bash
- Operating system: Linux
- License: GPLv2
- Website: github.com/dkms-project/dkms
- Repository: github.com/dkms-project/dkms

Dynamic Kernel Module Support (DKMS) is a program/framework that enables generating Linux kernel modules whose sources generally reside outside the kernel source tree. The concept is to have DKMS modules automatically rebuilt when a new kernel is installed.

== Framework ==
An essential feature of DKMS is that it automatically recompiles all DKMS modules if a new kernel version is installed. This allows drivers and devices outside of the mainline kernel to continue working after a Linux kernel upgrade.

Another benefit of DKMS is that it allows the installation of a new driver on an existing system, running an arbitrary kernel version, without any need for manual compilation or precompiled packages provided by the vendor.

DKMS was written by the Linux Engineering Team at Dell in 2003. It is included in many distributions, such as Ubuntu, Debian, Fedora, SUSE, Mageia and Arch. DKMS is free software released under the terms of the GNU General Public License (GPL) v2 or later.

DKMS supports both the rpm and deb package formats out of the box.

== See also ==
- Binary blob
