= Consultant Plus =

Russian legal assistance system

- Developer: Closed Joint Stock Company "Consultant Plus"
- Release: 1992
- Stable release: Технология ТОП / 2023
- Written in: C++
- Operating system: Microsoft Windows, iOS, Android, Windows Phone
- Type: Law assistance system
- License: Proprietary
- Website: www.consultant.ru

Consultant Plus (Russian: Консультант Плюс) is a cross-platform legal reference system developed in Russia. Initially, the development of the system was carried out by the Scientific and Production Association Computational Mathematics and Informatics (NPO VMI), which was responsible for the development of the Garant (Legal Reference System) system. The first version of the system was released in 1992. Consultant's centralized database is updated daily. It is distributed via a network of partners.

Its major competitors are Garant and Codex and Techexpert, both proprietary.

On the official website, the developer provides the opportunity to work with a non-commercial online version, an abbreviated version of commercial systems. ConsultantPlus annually releases limited free versions of its system for universities, schools, etc. (until the fall of 2019, the disks "Higher School" and "Secondary School", starting in the fall of 2019. The online version of ConsultantPlus: Student and the free archive of ConsultantPlus: Secondary School). The documentation supplied with these versions is often improperly called a textbook (for example, "Introduction to Legal Informatics"), but it only serves to teach the user how to work with the interfaces of a specific program "ConsultantPlus".

It is distributed through a network of regional information centers.

The full federal law database includes over 3 million documents; regional acts are distributed in a separate database with over 4 million documents.

The information contained in the system is structured into several notions, including:

1. legislation
2. jurisprudence
3. financial advice
4. legislation commentaries
5. document forms (templates)
6. legislation drafts
7. international legal acts
8. health protection legal acts
9. technical standards and rules

Every class mentioned above consists of several information banks to simplify the search throughout the database by manually excluding the classes and banks inappropriate for each current search.

The database includes:

- normative legal acts of Russia and its federal subjects, as well as international
- commentaries and explanations for them, precedents from the common practice
- articles and books from periodicals and text collections
- forms of account correspondence
- forms of the documents (officially standardized and approximate)
- other helpful information (accountant calendar, exchange rates, bank rate, etc.)
- analytical reports
