= IEs4Linux =

- IEs4Linux rendering the English Wikipedia with the Ubuntu operating system.
- Original author(s): Tatanka
- Developer(s): Tatanka
- Initial release: October 28, 2005; 19 years ago
- Stable release: 2.99.0.1 / February 6, 2008; 17 years ago
- Operating system: Linux/FreeBSD (or any platform that wine supports) + Wine
- Platform: Linux/Mac OS X
- Available in: Multilanguage
- Type: Web browser
- License: GPL
- Website: http://www.tatanka.com.br/ies4linux/ (Defunct)

IEs4Linux is a free and open source script that allows a user to run Internet Explorer (IE) using Wine. It is possible to install Internet Explorer versions 5, 5.5, and 6, along with partial functionality of IE7 (the layout engine was loaded into the IE6 interface, which works well enough to demonstrate how the target page looks in IE7).

This application is oriented towards web developers: it allows users of non-Windows operating systems to view their web pages in a similar manner to how they look on Windows and user who need to use web applications targeted to IE users.

There was a blog post on January 5, 2011, announcing that the developers are now working to support IE9 and will soon release a new version after almost three years of inactivity, however there was never a new release.

== Technical notes ==
Version 2.99.0.1 does not work out-of-the-box on newer Wine and KDE versions. The solution is to create a symlink with

   sudo ln -sv /usr/bin/winecfg /usr/bin/wineprefixcreate

and then run ./ies4linux with the --no-gui command line option.

== Discontinuation ==
IEs4Linux has not received any updates in 16 years as of 2024.
