= Organically Grown Company (Oregon) =

- Company type: private
- Industry: Organic food distributor
- Founded: 1978
- Headquarters: Eugene, Oregon, U.S.
- Number of employees: 200 (2013)

The Organically Grown Company (OGC) is a wholesale distributor of organic produce located in Eugene, Oregon, United States.

== History ==
Started as the Organically Grown Cooperative in 1978, it started as a non-profit corporation run by hippies in Eugene, Oregon. It started out as a cooperative wholesaler of organic fruits, vegetables and herbs in the Pacific Northwest. In 1983, the company started distributions from Eugene, which grew to another warehouse in 1993 in Portland, Oregon. After an expansion with another warehouse in Kent, Washington, Organically Grown Company opened a 120,000-square-foot (11,000 m^{2}) warehouse in Gresham, Oregon, in 2012. As of February 2013, the 200-person company had annual revenues in excess of $100 million.

== Operations ==
They provide service to over 200 natural and fine foods retailers, supermarket chains, restaurants, juicing companies, food processors and other wholesalers. Retailers include independent natural food stores in the northwest and chains Fred Meyer, and PCC markets in Seattle among others. The business was created by farmers as a support cooperative, and continues to work closely with the northwest's growers to supply local communities with produce. OGC's Ladybug brand represents the efforts of 42 local farms that supply over 120 different fruits and vegetables in season.
