= Garant =

Russian legal research company

GARANT
- Developer(s): «Garant-Service-Universitet»
- Stable release: 8.0
- Operating system: Microsoft Windows; Linux (via WINE@Etersoft) iOS; Android
- Type: legal reference system
- License: proprietor
- Website: www.garant.ru

GARANT (Russian: ГАРАНТ) is a complex of services based on a legal information resource developed by the Garant-Service-Universitet Scientific-Production Enterprise Limited Liability Company, the first large-scale commercial legal information system in Russia (since 1990) containing the legislation of the Russian Federation (also in the English language).

== The GARANT Legal Information Resource Complex ==
GARANT is a cross-referenced legal information resource, with the following elements:

The GARANT System – a legal information database, updated daily, providing for quick and precise searches, complex analysis of a legal situation, and keeping abreast of changes in legislation in an online format.

PRIME – a daily individualised information feed that contains legal news and hundreds of thousands of commentaries on legal acts and court practice, and that enables creating overviews of changes in the legislation.

Legal Consulting – access to a body of knowledge of experts in legal consulting: to solutions of tens of thousands of real practical situations, with the option of receiving individual written consultations.

All-Russia Satellite Online-Seminars – interactive participation in seminars given by specialists in Moscow broadcast to other towns and cities throughout Russia, incorporating the possibility of getting answers to questions asked through the system.

Electronic Express – a service providing electronic digital signatures for participation in electronic trading in state and municipal procurement initiatives.

Garant Vesti [Garant News] – a colour publication informing users about changes in the legislation, interesting court practice, new developments in the field of legal information provision, and effective applications of work with legal information.

Professional Journals – «Aktualnaya Bukhgalteria» [Current Bookkeeping]: information for bookkeepers; and «Zakonadatelstvo» [Legislation]: authoritative legal analysis for lawyers.

Consultations on Efficient Use of the System – assistance from specialists, plus resource materials allowing for quick and easy retrieval and analysis of information; professional-user certificates also obtainable.

The WWW.GARANT.RU Legal Portal – a source of legal information: legislation news, just-released documents, consultations, internet conferences with senior state officials, and dialogue on the popular trade forum.

Service – assistance in solving technical questions on working with the GARANT legal information resource, a hot-line, and dedicated personal managers.

== System contents ==
At present the GARANT system contains more than 30 million documents: acts of official bodies (including all laws, Presidential decrees, codes, rules and regulations), court practice materials, constantly updated interactive encyclopedias, a library of trade press articles and books and commentaries on the legislation, official bookkeeping and statistical accounting forms, economic and legal terms (in explanatory dictionaries in six European languages), economic and reference information (business enquiries, bookkeeping calendar, contact details of official bodies, etc.).

== System functionality ==
The GARANT L.E.S. provides for different types of information searches. The main type of search is the Basic Search, of one line, created specially for working with legal information.

The system is fully integrated with the internet; there is a free-of-charge internet version containing the main regulatory documents of Russia and a fuller internet version, accessible on a commercial basis.

== Miscellaneous ==
Delivery and installation of the GARANT legal information resource are handled by more than 250 partner organisations in 500 towns and cities of Russia.
