= TouchHLE =

Emulator for iOS applications

touchHLE
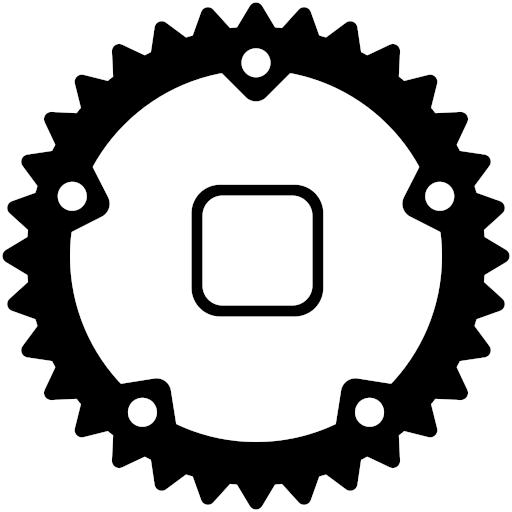

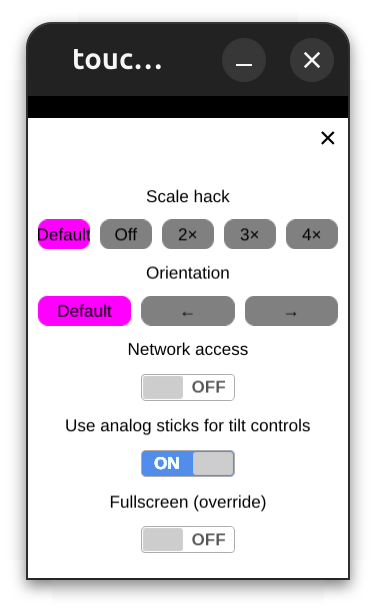
- Screenshot of touchHLE options page
- Original authors: hikari_no_yume, ciciplusplus
- Developers: hikari_no_yume and 25 others
- Stable release: 0.3.0
- Written in: Rust
- Operating system: Android, macOS, Microsoft Windows
- License: Mozilla Public License 2.0
- Website: https://touchhle.org/
- Repository: https://github.com/touchHLE/touchHLE

touchHLE is a free and open-source high-level emulator for early iOS applications, developed primarily for running older mobile games on modern operating systems. Originally created by a programmer using the pseudonym hikari_no_yume, it is written in Rust and is available for Microsoft Windows, macOS and Android.

First released in February 2023, it initially supported the 2008 iOS version of Super Monkey Ball, one of the launch titles for the App Store. Subsequent releases expanded compatibility with other games and added support for Android devices. Version 0.3.0, released in October 2026, introduced support for iPad applications and programs developed for iOS 4.0.

== Development ==
Development began in December 2022 as a personal project by hikari_no_yume, who sought to make the original iOS version of Super Monkey Ball playable again. The game had become incompatible with newer iOS releases, particularly following Apple's removal of support for 32-bit applications in iOS 11 in 2017. According to the developer, the project was motivated partly by nostalgia for the game, which had been released alongside the App Store in July 2008.

The first public release, version 0.1.0, was published in February 2023. It supported Windows and macOS and could run Super Monkey Ball with graphics, sound and saved game data. The emulator also allowed the game to be rendered at resolutions higher than those supported by the original iPhone hardware. Support for additional titles, including Crash Bandicoot Nitro Kart 3D, was introduced during subsequent development.

In April 2023, developer ciciplusplus demonstrated a port of touchHLE to Android, allowing older iPhone games to run on devices using the AArch64 architecture. Official Android support was included in version 0.2.0, released on August 31, 2023. The update also introduced a graphical application selector, improvements to the emulation of iOS interface components, and support for physical accelerometer input.

Development continued with contributions from additional programmers. Version 0.3.0, released on October 1, 2026, added support for iPhone OS 3.2, iOS 4.0 and iPad applications. It also introduced improvements to threading and compatibility with additional games, including Angry Birds, Fruit Ninja and Dead Space.

== Emulation and compatibility ==
Unlike low-level emulators that reproduce a device's hardware and operating system, touchHLE implements parts of the iOS operating environment itself. It provides replacements for system frameworks such as Foundation, UIKit, OpenGL ES and OpenAL, allowing compatible applications to run without a complete copy of Apple's operating system or firmware.

The emulator is primarily intended for 32-bit games developed for iPhone OS 2.x, iPhone OS 3.x and iOS 4.0.x. Its compatibility is limited to particular applications rather than all software designed for these operating systems. The project maintains a community-contributed compatibility database recording which applications are known to work and the extent of their functionality.

On desktop systems, touchHLE can simulate touchscreen and accelerometer input using a mouse or game controller. Devices equipped with touchscreens or accelerometers can use their native inputs. The emulator requires decrypted application files, and compatible commercial games are not distributed with the software. The developers have ruled out support for 64-bit iOS applications, although later 32-bit iOS versions remain possible targets for future development.

As of November 2026, the project's community-maintained compatibility database listed 295 fully functional applications and another 202 with only minor issues. An additional 99 applications were reported to have partial functionality with major issues.

== Reception ==
The initial release received coverage for its potential to preserve games rendered incompatible with newer iOS devices. GamesRadar+ praised the emulation of Super Monkey Ball, reporting stable performance and effective gamepad controls, although it noted that setting up the emulator was not straightforward.

TechSpot reported that the first release could run Super Monkey Ball at approximately 30 frames per second and at resolutions above those of the original hardware. It also noted the emulator's limited initial compatibility and lack of a graphical interface. Following the Android port, 9to5Mac observed that touchHLE remained limited to older applications and required users to supply their own compatible application files.
