= List of software that uses Subversion =

The following is a list of software that uses Subversion, a revision control system used in software development.

- SubversionEdge, a web-based front-end for Subversion.
- TeamForge, distributed agile application lifecycle management software.
- TortoiseSVN, an extension for Microsoft Explorer.
- SnailSVN, a Mac OS X GUI client with Finder integration.
- VisualSVN Server, a commercial and proprietary Subversion server package for Windows operating system.
- Mindquarry, open-source collaborative software geared towards small and medium-sized workgroups.
- Polarion ALM for Subversion - web based application lifecycle management platform.
- RapidSVN, a visual subversion client.
- SharpForge, a project management and bug-tracking web application.
- SVK, a distributed revision control system.
- svnX, an open-source GUI client for Mac OS X.
- Versions, a Mac OS X GUI client.
- Cornerstone, a Mac OS X GUI client.
- RabbitVCS, an extension for GNOME's Nautilus file manager and gedit text editor.
- Agilo for Trac, a web-based Scrum tool.
- SVN Repo Browser Pro, an iPhone and iPad client.
- BugBranch, an iPhone and iPad client.
- Subdivision, a commercial GUI tool for managing Subversion repositories.

== Integrated development environments ==
The following integrated development environments (IDEs) support, or can be integrated with, Subversion:

- Coda; as of version 1.5, integrates Subversion support
- SlickEdit
- Xcode – Apple's macOS IDE
- Microsoft Visual Studio, using the following add-ins: Agent SVN, plug-in that allows Subversion to integrate with Visual Studio; AnkhSVN, a Visual Studio .NET add-on, which allows one to perform the most common Subversion operations from directly inside the VS.NET IDE; VisualSVN, a Subversion integration for Visual Studio 2003–2017; PushOk SVN SCC PlugIn, another Visual Studio addin.
- Borland and Embarcadero Technologies Delphi rapid application development (RAD) Studio, via a DelphiSVN plug-in.
- Eclipse, via these environments and plug-ins: Aptana; Subclipse, an open source project that integrates Subversion into Eclipse IDE, Subversive, an Eclipse project to provide Subversion support in Eclipse (this plug-in is the EasyEclipse bundle).
- Zend Studio
- KDevelop
- Emacs
- TeXstudio
- Vim
- NetBeans
- JDeveloper
- phpDesigner
- Qt Creator
- Eric Python IDE
- ActiveState Komodo
- BBEdit, a Mac OS X-based text editor.
- UEStudio, a lightweight IDE
- SharpDevelop, a free IDE for C#, VB.NET and Boo projects on Microsoft's .NET platform.
- TextMate, an extensible editor for Mac OS X
- Dreamweaver version CS4 now includes support for Subversion (previous versions did not support Subversion). Also, Subweaver is a Dreamweaver extension that integrates SVN commands by interacting with a TortoiseSVN installation
- BlueJ
- CoDeSys, an IDE for IEC-61131 programming languages has an optional, non-free Subversion integration plugin.
- IntelliJ IDEA (and all other JetBrains IDEs)
