= List of shell icon overlay identifiers =

Shell icon overlays are icons that Microsoft Windows can display on top of folder icons. A list of icon overlays is specified in the Windows Registry in the location mentioned further in this article. In the current implementation there are 4 bits in a structure that define the overlay index providing for a maximum of 15 overlays, 4 of which are reserved by the operating system. Therefore, even though more than 11 icon overlay handlers can be registered, only the first 11 icon overlays supplied by icon overlay handlers are effectively displayed. The remaining icon overlay handlers are not used.

Many applications such as versioning software like TortoiseSVN and cloud storage synchronization software like Nextcloud, Dropbox, and OneDrive add their own icon overlay handlers to the Registry upon installation. Below is a table of shell icon overlay identifiers by software.

== Location ==
All shell icon overlay identifiers are located in the Windows Registry.

Computer\HKEY_LOCAL_MACHINE\SOFTWARE\Microsoft\Windows\CurrentVersion\Explorer\ShellIconOverlayIdentifiers

== List ==
Category	Software	Registry Name	Icon	Description (Symbol)	Icon Version (Date)	Source
Cloud Storage Services	Adobe Creative Cloud	AccExtIco1		Synced file or folder; finished sync.		
Cloud Storage Services	Adobe Creative Cloud	AccExtIco2		In process of syncing to ACC servers. (Symbol: Horizontal blue arrows)		
Cloud Storage Services	Adobe Creative Cloud	AccExtIco3		unknown (Symbol: unknown)		
Cloud Storage Services	Dropbox	DropboxExt01		Synced file or folder; finished sync. Downloaded local content on your hard drive. (Symbol: Solid Green check ✓)	v73.4.118(May 24, 2019)	See inside each cell.
Cloud Storage Services	Dropbox	DropboxExt02		Sync in progress; in process of syncing to Dropbox servers. (Symbol: Blue w/ rotating arrow)	v73.4.118(May 24, 2019)	See inside each cell.
Cloud Storage Services	Dropbox	DropboxExt03		(Year: 2019): Sync not happening; something wrong due to invalid file names, permission error, rapid multiple edits, or out of storage space. (Symbol: Red X) OR (Year: 2014)	v73.4.118(May 24, 2019)	See inside each cell.
Cloud Storage Services	Dropbox	DropboxExt04		(Year: 2019): A file or folder is not syncing when using the Selective-sync feature (meaning you have opted not to sync this file or folder on your computer). In general, selectively synced files or folders will not appear in Dropbox Folder on your computer. However, if you create two files or folders with the same name, the gray icon will appear, indicating that one of the files is not being synced. (Symbol: Gray minus) OR (Year: 2014)	v73.4.118(May 24, 2019)	See inside each cell.
Cloud Storage Services	Dropbox	DropboxExt05		(Year: 2019): Locked: Synced!; View-only access to file or folder. Read-only, cannot edit or share with others. Request edit access with owner. (Symbol: Green check ✓ w/ Lockpad) OR (Year: 2014)	v73.4.118(May 24, 2019)	See inside each cell.
Cloud Storage Services	Dropbox	DropboxExt06		(Year: 2019): Locked: Sync in progress; View-only access to file or folder. Read-only, cannot edit or share with others. Request edit access with owner. (Symbol: Blue w/ rotating arrows and w/ Lockpad) OR (Year: 2014)	v73.4.118(May 24, 2019)	See inside each cell.
Cloud Storage Services	Dropbox	DropboxExt07		(Year: 2019): SmartSync feature, Online-Only content. These appear in your Dropbox Folder on your computer, but they are not fully downloaded. Placeholder icons. (Symbol: Grey w/ white cloud shape) OR (Year: 2014)	v73.4.118(May 24, 2019)	See inside each cell.
Cloud Storage Services	Dropbox	DropboxExt08		(Year: 2019): SmartSync feature, Online-Only content. These appear in your Dropbox Folder on your computer, but they are not fully downloaded. Placeholder icons.View-only access to file or folder. Read-only, cannot edit or share with others. Request edit access with owner. (Symbol: Grey w/ white cloud shape and w/ Lockpad) OR (Year: 2014)	v73.4.118(May 24, 2019)	See inside each cell.
Cloud Storage Services	Dropbox	DropboxExt09		Mixed State: contains both local and online-only files. (Symbol: White and Green check ✓)	v73.4.118(May 24, 2019)	See inside each cell.
Cloud Storage Services	Dropbox	DropboxExt10		Locked: Read-only; Mixed State: contains both local and online-only files. (Symbol: White and Green check ✓ w/ Lockpad)	v73.4.118(May 24, 2019)	See inside each cell.
Cloud Storage Services	OneDrive Personal	OneDrive1		Cannot Sync (i.e. ErrorOverlayHandler Class) (Symbol:Red X)	v19.070 (May 13, 2019)	1,2,3,4
Cloud Storage Services	OneDrive Personal	OneDrive2		Shared with others (i.e. [SharedOverlayHandler Class) (Symbol:Green + People)	v19.070 (May 13, 2019)	1,2,3,4
Cloud Storage Services	OneDrive Personal	OneDrive3		Online-only files do not take up space on your device, file is only available online, but can be downloaded with internet. (i.e. UpToDateCloudOverlayHandler Class) (Symbol: Blue cloud)	v19.070 (May 13, 2019)	1,2,3,4
Cloud Storage Services	OneDrive Personal	OneDrive4		Files is "Always-keep-on device". 'Always available files' download to device and take up space, always available even without internet. (i.e. UpToDatePinnedOverlayHandler Class) (Symbol: Green ✓ w/ solid green background)	v19.070 (May 13, 2019)	1,2,3,4
Cloud Storage Services	OneDrive Personal	OneDrive5		Sync in progress (i.e. SyncingOverlayHandler Class) (Symbol: Rotating blue arrows)	v19.070 (May 13, 2019)	1,2,3,4
Cloud Storage Services	OneDrive Personal	OneDrive6		Locked (read only); Has settings preventing it from syncing. (i.e. [ReadOnlyOverlayHandler Class) (Symbol: Green Lockpad)	v19.070 (May 13, 2019)	1,2,3,4
Cloud Storage Services	OneDrive Personal	OneDrive7		When you open an online-only file, it downloads to your device and becomes locally available file, even without internet. (i.e. UpToDateUnpinnedOverlayHandler Class) (Symbol: Green ✓ w/ white background)	v19.070 (May 13, 2019)	1,2,3,4
Cloud Storage Services	OneDrive for Business (formerly SkyDrive)	SkyDrivePro1 (ErrorConflict)		Error Conflict (Symbol: Red X)	v19.070 (May 13, 2019)	1
Cloud Storage Services	OneDrive for Business (formerly SkyDrive)	SkyDrivePro2 (SyncInProgress)		Sync in Progress (Symbol: Blue rotating arrow)	v19.070 (May 13, 2019)	1
Cloud Storage Services	OneDrive for Business (formerly SkyDrive)	SkyDrivePro3 (InSync)		In Sync (Symbol: Solid Green check ✓)	v19.070 (May 13, 2019)	1
Cloud Storage Services	NextCloud	OCError		Sync Error or Blacklisted file (Symbol: Red X)	v2.5(Apr 11, 2019)	1
Cloud Storage Services	NextCloud	OCOK		File is Synced w/ server (Symbol: Solid Green check ✓)	v2.5(Apr 11, 2019)	1
Cloud Storage Services	NextCloud	OCOKShared		Shared (Symbol: Green share icon)	v2.5(Apr 11, 2019)	1
Cloud Storage Services	NextCloud	OCSync		Sync in progress (Symbol: Blue w/ rotating arrow)	v2.5(Apr 11, 2019)	1
Cloud Storage Services	NextCloud	OCWarning		Sync Error or Warning (Symbol: Yellow exclamation !)	v2.5(Apr 11, 2019)	1
Cloud Storage Services	Google Backup & Sync (formerly Google Drive)	GoogleDriveBlacklisted		Not able to Sync (Symbol: Red X)	v3.43.4275 (Oct 15, 2018)	1
Cloud Storage Services	Google Backup & Sync (formerly Google Drive)	GoogleDriveSynced		Synced (Symbol: Green check ✓)	v3.43.4275 (Oct 15, 2018)	1
Cloud Storage Services	Google Backup & Sync (formerly Google Drive)	GoogleDriveSyncing		Sync in progress (Symbol: Rotating blue arrows)	v3.43.4275 (Oct 15, 2018)	1
Cloud Storage Services	odrive	0drive.Active		Sync in progress (Symbol: Fuchsia w/ rotating white arrows)	v6627 (Jul 01, 2020)	
Cloud Storage Services	odrive	0drive.Synced		Synced (Symbol: Light blue w/ white check ✓)	v6627 (Jul 01, 2020)	
Source Code Management System clients	TortoiseSVN, TortoiseGit and TortoiseHg	Tortoise1Normal		Normal (Symbol: Solid Green check ✓)	v1.12.0 (Apr 17, 2019)	1,2
Source Code Management System clients	TortoiseSVN, TortoiseGit and TortoiseHg	Tortoise2Modified		Modified (Symbol: Red !)	v1.12.0 (Apr 17, 2019)	1,2
Source Code Management System clients	TortoiseSVN, TortoiseGit and TortoiseHg	Tortoise3Conflict		Conflict (Symbol: Yellow triangle !)	v1.12.0 (Apr 17, 2019)	1,2
Source Code Management System clients	TortoiseSVN, TortoiseGit and TortoiseHg	Tortoise4Locked		Locked (Symbol: Yellow Lockpad)	v1.12.0 (Apr 17, 2019)	1,2
Source Code Management System clients	TortoiseSVN, TortoiseGit and TortoiseHg	Tortoise5ReadOnly		Read only (Symbol: Grey check ✓)	v1.12.0 (Apr 17, 2019)	1,2
Source Code Management System clients	TortoiseSVN, TortoiseGit and TortoiseHg	Tortoise6Deleted		Deleted (Symbol: Red X)	v1.12.0 (Apr 17, 2019)	1,2
Source Code Management System clients	TortoiseSVN, TortoiseGit and TortoiseHg	Tortoise7Added		Added (Symbol: Blue plus +)	v1.12.0 (Apr 17, 2019)	1,2
Source Code Management System clients	TortoiseSVN, TortoiseGit and TortoiseHg	Tortoise8Ignored		Ignored (Symbol: Grey minus)	v1.12.0 (Apr 17, 2019)	1,2
Source Code Management System clients	TortoiseSVN, TortoiseGit and TortoiseHg	Tortoise9Unversioned		Unversioned (Symbol: Blue question mark ?)	v1.12.0 (Apr 17, 2019)	1,2
NTFS link Manage	Link Shell Extension	HardLinkMenu		Context Menu	v3.9.3.1 (Nov 23, 2019)	
NTFS link Manage	Link Shell Extension	IconOverlayHardLink	/	Hardlink (Symbol: Red arrow)	v3.9.3.1 (Nov 23, 2019)	
NTFS link Manage	Link Shell Extension	IconOverlayJunction	/	Junction (Symbol: Metal link)	v3.9.3.1 (Nov 23, 2019)	
NTFS link Manage	Link Shell Extension	IconOverlaySymbolicLink	/	Symbolic Link (Symbol: Green arrow)	v3.9.3.1 (Nov 23, 2019)	
