= TortoiseCVS =

Revision control system for Windows

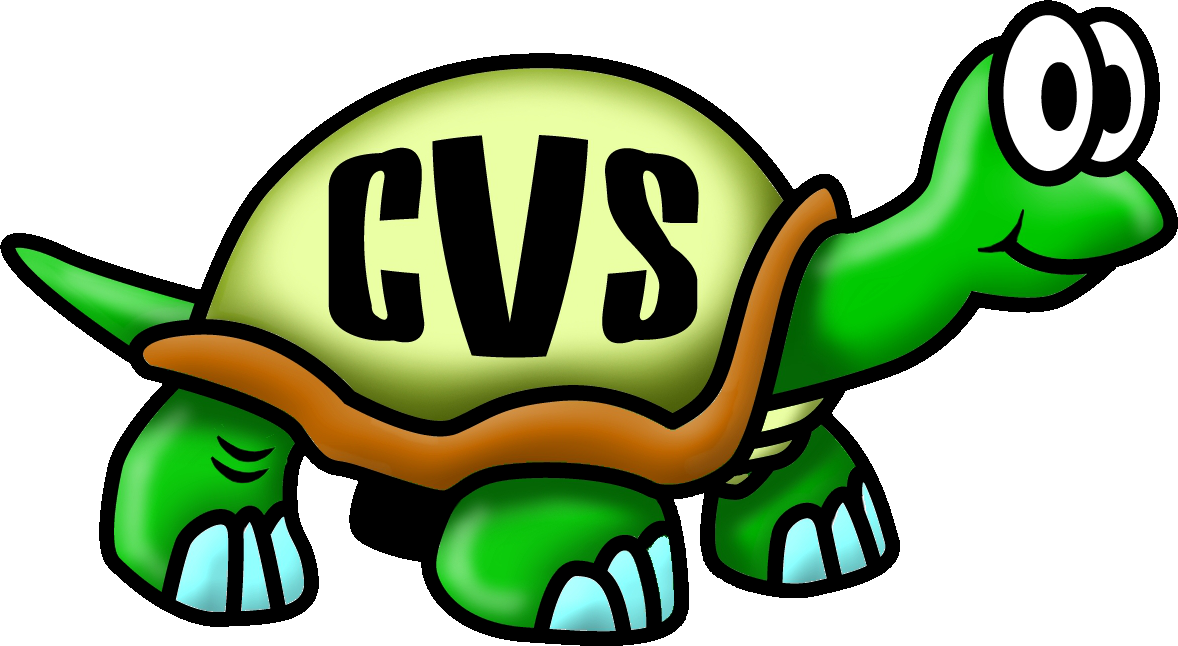
- Charlie, the TortoiseCVS mascot.
- Original author: Francis Irving
- Developer: TortoiseCVS Contributors
- Initial release: 4 August 2000; 25 years ago
- Stable release: 1.12.5 / 24 January 2011; 14 years ago
- Preview release: 1.12.6 RC1 / 9 August 2012; 13 years ago
- Repository: tortoisecvs.cvs.sourceforge.net/viewvc/tortoisecvs/
- Written in: C++
- Operating system: Microsoft Windows
- Available in: 23 languages
- List of languages Arabic, Brazilian Portuguese, Catalan, Chinese (simplified), Chinese (traditional), Czech, Danish, Dutch, English, French, Georgian, German, Hungarian, Italian, Japanese, Korean, Norwegian, Polish, Romanian, Russian, Slovene, Spanish, Turkish
- Type: Revision control
- License: GPL
- Website: www.tortoisecvs.org

TortoiseCVS is a CVS client for Microsoft Windows released under the GNU General Public License. Unlike most CVS tools, it integrates into Windows' shell by adding entries in the contextual menu of the file explorer. Therefore, it does not run in its own window. Moreover, it adds icons to files and directories controlled by CVS, giving additional information to the user without having to run a full-scale stand-alone application.

The name is a pun on the words shell (computing, turtle). The tortoise in the logo is called Charlie Vernon Smythe (CVS).

The project was initiated by Francis Irving when Creature Labs employed him to develop a better interface to CVS for his colleagues. Some of the code was derived from WinCVS and CVSNT. The first release was on 4 August 2000.

== Criticism ==
TortoiseCVS will always add the argument "-c" to most CVS operations when communicating with a CVS server. This causes standard non-CVSNT servers to fail, as they are not aware of this argument.

== Ports and forks ==
- TortoiseSVN, a similar tool for use with Subversion, is inspired by TortoiseCVS
- TortoiseDarcs, a similar tool for use with Darcs, derived from TortoiseCVS
- TortoiseBzr, a similar tool for use with Bazaar, is inspired by TortoiseCVS and TortoiseSVN
- TortoiseHg, a similar tool for Mercurial
- TortoiseGit, a port of TortoiseSVN to Git using msysgit
- Git-cheetah, a similar tool for use with Git
- Dubbelbock TFS is a similar tool for use with Team Foundation Server
