= SIP (software) =

- Original author(s): Phil Thompson
- Written in: C, C++
- License: GPL and other
- Website: riverbankcomputing.co.uk/software/sip/intro

SIP is an open source software tool used to connect computer programs or libraries written in C or C++ with the scripting language Python. It is an alternative to SWIG.

SIP was originally developed in 1998 for PyQt — the Python bindings for the Qt GUI toolkit — but is suitable for generating bindings for any C or C++ library.

== Concept ==
SIP takes a set of specification (.sip) files describing the API and generates the required C++ code. This is then compiled to produce the Python extension modules. A .sip file is essentially the class header file with some things removed (because SIP does not include a full C++ parser) and some things added (because C++ does not always provide enough information about how the API works).

For PyQt v4 I use an internal tool (written using PyQt of course) called metasip. This is sort of an IDE for SIP. It uses GCC-XML to parse the latest header files and saves the relevant data, as XML, in a metasip project. metasip then does the equivalent of a diff against the previous version of the API and flags up any changes that need to be looked at. Those changes are then made through the GUI and ticked off the TODO list. Generating the .sip files is just a button click. In my subversion repository, PyQt v4 is basically just a 20M XML file. Updating PyQt v4 for a minor release of Qt v4 is about half an hours work. In terms of how the generated code works then I don't think it's very different from how any other bindings generator works. Python has a very good C API for writing extension modules - it's one of the reasons why so many 3rd party tools have Python bindings. For every C++ class, the SIP generated code creates a corresponding Python class implemented in C.

— Phil Thompson, developer and maintainer

== Notable applications that use SIP ==
- PyQt, a python port of the application framework and widget toolkit Qt
- QGIS, a free and open-source cross-platform desktop geographic information system (GIS)
- QtiPlot, a computer program to analyze and visualize scientific data
- calibre (software), a free and open-source cross-platform e-book manager
- Veusz, a free and open-source cross-platform program to visualize scientific data
