= TortoiseGit =

Windows revision control system client

- Developer: TortoiseGit team
- Release: December 12, 2008; 17 years ago
- Stable release: 2.19.0 / 20 June 2026; 4 months ago
- Written in: C++, C
- Operating system: Microsoft Windows
- Available in: 34 languages, 7 full translations
- Type: Git client
- License: GNU General Public License
- Website: tortoisegit.org
- Repository: gitlab.com/tortoisegit/tortoisegit

TortoiseGit is a Git revision control client, implemented as a Windows shell extension and based on TortoiseSVN. It is free software released under the GNU General Public License.

In Windows Explorer, besides showing context menu items for Git commands, TortoiseGit provides icon overlays that indicate the status of Git working trees and files.

It also comes with the TortoiseGitMerge utility to visually compare two files and resolve conflicts.

== See also ==
- TortoiseCVS, a Concurrent Versions System client for the Microsoft Windows platform
- TortoiseSVN, a Subversion client for the Microsoft Windows platform
- TortoiseHg, a Mercurial client that can also be used as a client to a Git server
- TortoiseBzr, a similar tool for use with Bazaar
- KortoiseGit, a modern port for KDE Dolphin
