= TortoiseHg =

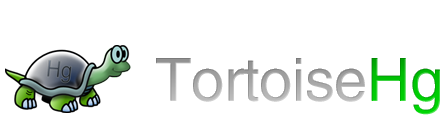

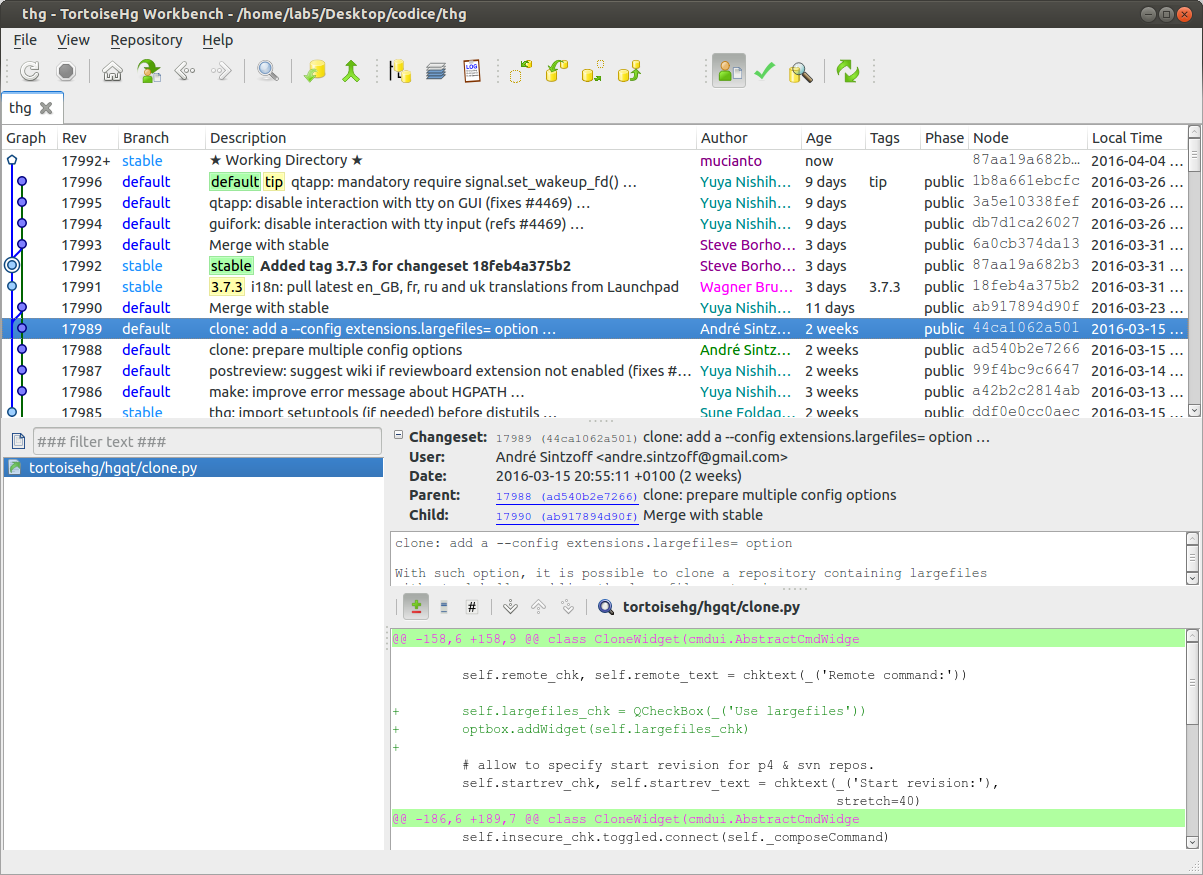
- Stable release: 6.6.3 / 13 February 2024; 13 months ago
- Repository: foss.heptapod.net/mercurial/tortoisehg/thg
- Written in: Python
- Operating system: Cross-platform
- Type: Mercurial client
- License: GNU General Public License
- Website: tortoisehg.bitbucket.io

TortoiseHg is a GUI front-end for Mercurial that runs on Microsoft Windows (on which it integrates directly with File Explorer), Mac OS X, and Linux.

It is written in PyQt (except the Windows shell extension), and the underlying client can be used on the command line.

It is often recommended and preferred for working with Mercurial on Windows.

This is a brief list of its features:

- Repository explorer
- Commit dialog
- Support for visual diff/merge tools.
- Data mining on repository contents
- Seamless support for serving a repository via Mercurial's integrated web interface.
- Repository synchronization
- Intuitive GUI for managing Mercurial settings

It is free software released under the GNU General Public License.

TortoiseHg can be used as a client to a git server.

In June 2020, TortoiseHg moved off of bitbucket when they stopped hosting mercurial projects, and found a new home with heptapod.

== See also ==
- TortoiseCVS, a Concurrent Versions System client for the Microsoft Windows platform
- TortoiseSVN, a Subversion client for the Microsoft Windows platform
- TortoiseGit, another Git client for the Microsoft Windows platform
- TortoiseBzr, a similar tool for use with Bazaar
