= PyGTK =

Set of Python wrappers for the GTK graphical user interface library

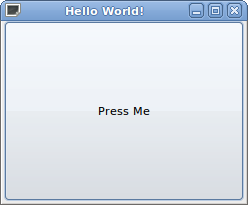
- Screenshot
- Original author: James Henstridge
- Developer: PyGTK Core development team
- Final release: 2.24.0 / 1 April 2011; 15 years ago
- Written in: Python, C
- Operating system: Cross-platform
- Platform: Cross-platform
- Type: Widget toolkit
- License: LGPL
- Website: pygobject.readthedocs.io/en/latest/
- Repository: gitlab.gnome.org/Archive/pygtk

PyGTK is a set of Python wrappers for the GTK graphical user interface library. PyGTK is free software and licensed under the LGPL. It is analogous to PyQt/PySide and wxPython, the Python wrappers for Qt and wxWidgets, respectively. Its original author is GNOME developer James Henstridge. There are six people in the core development team, with various other people who have submitted patches and bug reports. PyGTK has been selected as the environment of choice for applications running on One Laptop Per Child systems.

PyGTK was phased out with the transition to GTK version 3 and be replaced with PyGObject, which uses GObject Introspection to generate bindings for Python and other languages on the fly. This is expected to eliminate the delay between GTK updates and corresponding language binding updates, as well as reduce maintenance burden on the developers.

== Syntax ==
The Python code below will produce a 200x200 pixel window with the words "Hello World" inside.

import gtk

def create_window():
    window = gtk.Window()
    window.set_default_size(200, 200)
    window.connect("destroy", gtk.main_quit)

    label = gtk.Label("Hello World")
    window.add(label)

    label.show()
    window.show()

create_window()
gtk.main()

=== Notable applications that have used PyGTK ===
PyGTK has been used in a number of notable applications, some examples:

- Anaconda installer
- BitTorrent
- Deluge
- Exaile
- Gajim
- Gedit (for optional Python subsystem and plugins)
- GIMP (for optional Python scripts)
- GNOME Sudoku
- Gramps
- Jokosher
- puddletag
- Pybliographer
- Tryton
- ROX Desktop (includes ROX-Filer)
- SoundConverter
- Ubiquity (Ubuntu installer)
- Ubuntu Software Center
- Wing IDE

== PyGObject ==
PyGObject
- Stable release: 3.55.3 / 4 February 2026; 8 months ago
- Written in: Python, C
- Type: Widget toolkit
- License: LGPL
- Website: {{URL|example.com|optional display text}}
- Repository: gitlab.gnome.org/GNOME/pygobject

PyGObject provides a wrapper for use in Python programs when accessing GObject libraries. GObject is an object system used by GTK, GLib, GIO, GStreamer and other libraries.

Like the GObject library itself, PyGObject is licensed under the GNU LGPL, so it is suitable for use in both free software and proprietary applications. It is already in use in many applications ranging from small single-purpose scripts to large full-featured applications.

PyGObject can dynamically access any GObject libraries that use GObject Introspection. It replaces the need for separate modules such as PyGTK, GIO and python-gnome to build a full GNOME 3.0 application. Once new functionality is added to GObject library it is instantly available as a Python API without the need for intermediate Python glue.

=== Notable applications that use PyGObject ===
PyGObject has replaced PyGTK, but it has taken a considerable amount of time for many programs to be ported. Most of the software listed here has an older version which used PyGTK.

- Gramps
- Meld
- Pitivi
- PyChess
- Quod Libet

== See also ==
- PyQt (Python wrapper for the Qt toolkit)
- PySide (Alternative Python wrapper for the Qt toolkit)
- wxPython (Python wrapper for the wx widgets collection)
