= VisualSVN =

VisualSVN for Visual Studio
- Developer: Axiorema
- Release: June 3, 2006; 20 years ago
- Stable release: 8.6.0 / November 17, 2026; 0 days ago
- Operating system: Microsoft Windows
- Type: version control, Subversion client
- License: Proprietary software Community license: Freeware; Corporate, Site, Personal: Trialware
- Website: www.visualsvn.com

VisualSVN for Visual Studio (also known as VisualSVN) is an extension for Microsoft Visual Studio that integrates the Apache Subversion version control system into the Visual Studio IDE. It allows developers to perform SVN version control operations directly within Visual Studio.

The tool has been recommended in Microsoft's MSDN Magazine and earned multiple Visual Studio Magazine Choice Awards in the Collaboration, Project Management and Agile Solutions category.

VisualSVN 8.x, the latest major version of the extension, supports Visual Studio 2026 and 2022, including the versions for ARM-based processors. Versions of the extension for earlier Visual Studio releases are also available.

== Overview ==
VisualSVN provides in-IDE access to version-control features of Subversion. It adds context menus with Subversion commands, adds Subversion status markers to Visual Studio's Solution Explorer: each file and folder has an icon indicating its SVN status (e.g., green for unmodified, yellow for modified, red for conflicted), adds a dedicated Pending Changes window, adds line-by-line marks to the Code Editor, conflict resolution and several other features.

A key feature of VisualSVN is its handling of Visual Studio-specific file operations. The plugin automatically tracks when files are added, renamed, or removed in a Visual Studio project and reflects those changes in the Subversion working copy.

== See also ==
- Apache Subversion - the version control system which VisualSVN integrates into Visual Studio.
- VisualSVN Server - a Subversion server for Windows
- TortoiseSVN - a popular Subversion client for Windows Explorer, which VisualSVN uses for some of its operations
