= PyQt =

Python GUI library

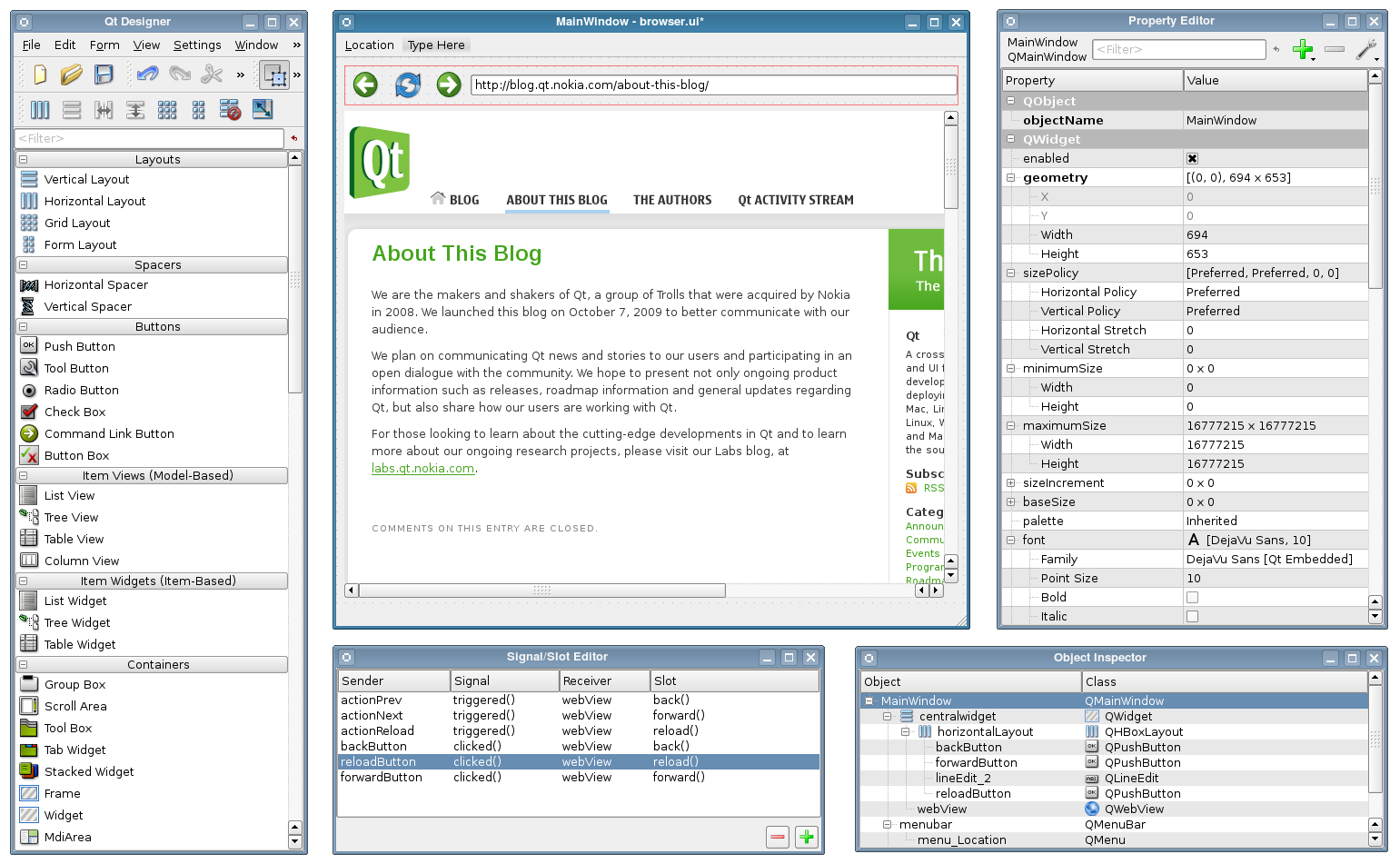
- Qt Designer
- Developer: Riverbank Computing
- Release: 1998
- Stable release: 6.9.1 / 6 June 2025; 17 months ago
- Written in: C++ / Python
- Operating system: Cross-platform
- License: GNU GPL and commercial
- Website: riverbankcomputing.com

PyQt is a Python binding of the cross-platform GUI toolkit Qt, implemented as a Python plug-in. PyQt is free software developed by the British firm Riverbank Computing. It is available under similar terms to Qt versions older than 4.5; this means a variety of licenses including GNU General Public License (GPL) and commercial license, but not the GNU Lesser General Public License (LGPL). PyQt supports Microsoft Windows as well as various kinds of UNIX, including Linux and macOS.

PyQt implements around 440 classes and over 6,000 functions and methods including:

- a substantial set of GUI widgets
- classes for accessing SQL databases (ODBC, MySQL, PostgreSQL, Oracle, SQLite)
- QScintilla, Scintilla-based rich text editor widget
- data aware widgets that are automatically populated from a database
- an XML parser
- SVG support
- classes for embedding ActiveX controls on Windows (only in commercial version)

To automatically generate these bindings, Phil Thompson developed the tool SIP, which is also used in other projects.

== History ==
PyQt was first released by Riverbank Computing in 1998.

In August 2009, Nokia sought for the Python binding to be available under the LGPL license. At the time, Nokia owned Qt Software, the developer of QT. After failing to reach an agreement with Riverbank Computing, Nokia released its binding, PySide, providing similar functionality.

== Main components ==
Alternative PyQt logo

PyQt4 contains the following Python modules.

- The QtCore module contains the core non-GUI classes, including the event loop and Qt's signal and slot mechanism. It also includes platform independent abstractions for Unicode, threads, mapped files, shared memory, regular expressions, and user and application settings.
- The QtGui module contains the majority of the GUI classes. These include a number of table, tree and list classes based on the model–view–controller design pattern. Also provided is a sophisticated 2D canvas widget capable of storing thousands of items including ordinary widgets.
- The QtNetwork module contains classes for writing UDP and TCP clients and servers. It includes classes that implement FTP and HTTP clients and support DNS lookups. Network events are integrated with the event loop making it very easy to develop networked applications.
- The QtOpenGL module contains classes that enable the use of OpenGL in rendering 3D graphics in PyQt applications.
- The QtSql module contains classes that integrate with open-source and proprietary SQL databases. It includes editable data models for database tables that can be used with GUI classes. It also includes an implementation of SQLite.
- The QtSvg module contains classes for displaying the contents of SVG files. It supports the static features of SVG 1.2 Tiny.
- The QtXml module implements SAX and DOM interfaces to Qt's XML parser.
- The QtMultimedia module implements low-level multimedia functionality. Application developers would normally use the phonon module.
- The QtDesigner module contains classes that allow Qt Designer to be extended using PyQt.
- The Qt module consolidates the classes contained in all of the modules described above into a single module. This has the advantage that you don't have to worry about which underlying module contains a particular class. It has the disadvantage that it loads the whole of the Qt framework, thereby increasing the memory footprint of an application. Whether you use this consolidated module, or the individual component modules is down to personal taste.
- The uic module implements support for handling the XML files created by Qt Designer that describe the whole or part of a graphical user interface. It includes classes that load an XML file and render it directly, and classes that generate Python code from an XML file for later execution.

PyQt5 contains the following Python modules:

- QtQml
- QtQuick
- QtCore
- QtGui
- QtPrintSupport
- QtWidgets
- QGLContext
- QGLFormat
- QGLWidget
- QtWebKit
- QtWebKitWidgets

== Versions ==
PyQt version 4 works with both Qt 4 and Qt 5. PyQt version 5 only supports Qt version 5, and drops support for features that are deprecated in Qt 5.

== Hello World example ==
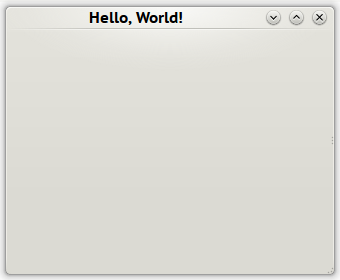
The result in KDE Plasma 4

The below code written for PyQt6 shows a small window on the screen.

#!/usr/bin/env python3
"""
Here we provide the necessary imports.
The basic GUI widgets are located in QtWidgets module.
"""
import sys
from PyQt6.QtWidgets import QApplication, QWidget

# Every PyQt application must create an application object.
# The application object is located in the QtWidgets module.
app = QApplication([])

# The QWidget widget is the base class of all user interface objects in PyQt.
# We provide the default constructor for QWidget. The default constructor has no parent.
# A widget with no parent is called a window.
root = QWidget()

root.resize(320, 240)  # The resize() method resizes the widget.
root.setWindowTitle("Hello, World!")  # Here we set the title for our window.
root.show()  # The show() method displays the widget on the screen.

sys.exit(app.exec())  # Finally, we enter the mainloop of the application.

== Notable applications that use PyQt ==
- Anki, a spaced repetition flashcard program
- Calibre, an E-book management application
- Dropbox, a file hosting service
- EarQuiz Frequencies, a free and open-source application for EQ/frequency ear training
- Electrum Bitcoin Wallet
- Eric Python IDE
- Frescobaldi, a score editor for LilyPond music files
- Kodos, a Python Regular expression Debugger
- Leo, an outliner and literate programming editor
- OpenLP, an open-source lyrics projection program
- OpenShot, a video editing program
- Orange, a data mining and visualization framework
- Puddletag, an open-source, cross-platform ID3 tag editor
- QGIS, a free software desktop Geographic Information Systems (GIS) application
- qutebrowser, a web browser with Vim-style key bindings and a minimal GUI.
- qt-recordMyDesktop, a Qt4 frontend for recordMyDesktop
- Spyder, a Python data science IDE
- TortoiseHg, a graphical interface for the Mercurial source management program (Hg)
- Veusz, a scientific plotting application
- GNS3, a network software emulator

== See also ==
- PyGTK (Python wrappers for GTK)
- PySide (Alternative Python wrapper for the Qt toolkit)
- wxPython (Python wrapper for the wx widgets collection)
- Kivy
- Tkinter (bundled with Python)
