= TortoiseSVN =

Software extension for managing source code

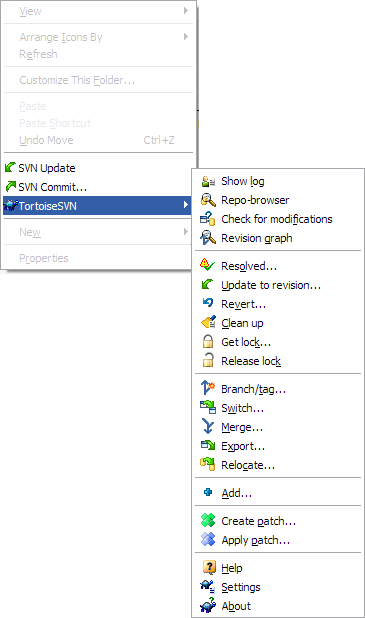
- Screenshot
- Original author: Tim Kemp
- Release: 2002
- Stable release: 1.14.7 / 16 April 2024; 2 years ago
- Written in: C++
- Operating system: Microsoft Windows
- Size: 20.3 MB
- Type: Subversion client
- License: GNU General Public License
- Website: tortoisesvn.net
- Repository: osdn.net/projects/tortoisesvn/scm/svn/

TortoiseSVN is a Subversion client, implemented as a Microsoft Windows shell extension, that helps programmers manage different versions of the source code for their programs. It is free software released under the GNU General Public License.

TortoiseSVN won the SourceForge.net 2007 Community Choice Award for Best Tool or Utility for Developers.

In Windows Explorer, besides showing context menu items for Subversion commands, TortoiseSVN provides icon overlay that indicates the status of Subversion working copies.

It also comes with the TortoiseMerge utility, available from Tigris.org website, to visually compare two files.

TortoiseSVN can be integrated into Microsoft Visual Studio by using a third-party plugin such as VsTortoise.

A third-party repository monitoring application using TortoiseSVN was named SVN-Monitor, then evolved into Vercue in 2011.

TortoiseSVN 1.9 and later requires at least Windows Vista or later.

== See also ==
- Apache Subversion
- VisualSVN Server
- VisualSVN
- TortoiseCVS, a similar tool for use with CVS that TortoiseSVN is based on.
- TortoiseGit, a similar tool for use with Git
- TortoiseBzr, a similar tool for use with Bazaar
- TortoiseHg, a similar tool for use with Mercurial
