= Veusz =

Plotting software

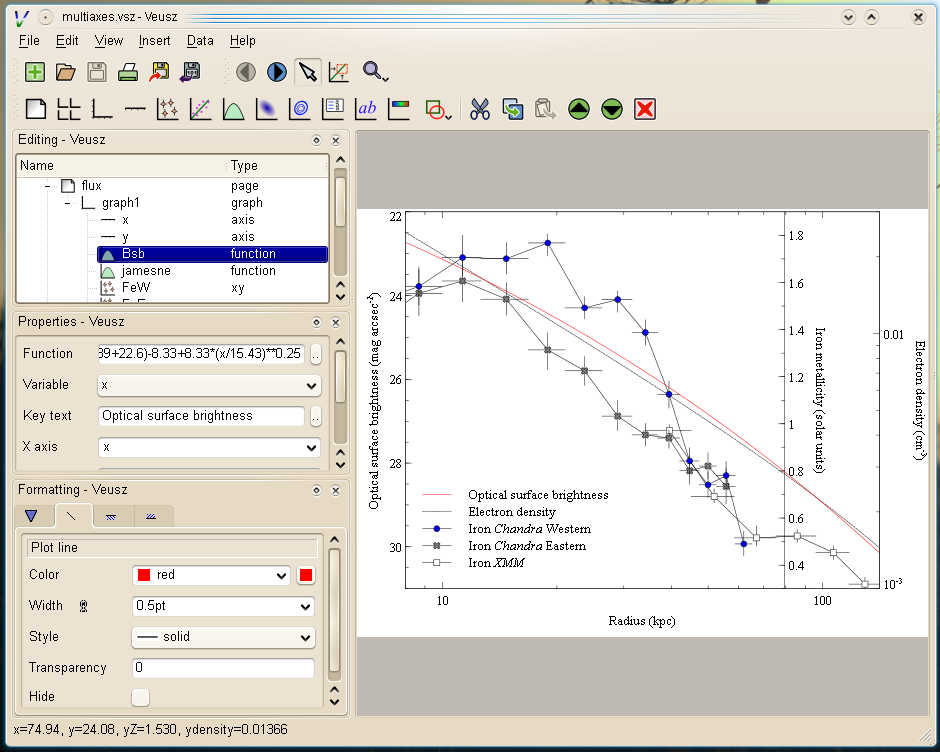
- Screenshot of Veusz 1.3 on Linux
- Original author: Jeremy Sanders
- Initial release: October 28, 2007; 18 years ago
- Stable release: 4.2 / 11 October 2025; 2 months ago
- Repository: github.com/veusz/veusz
- Written in: C, C++, Python
- Operating system: Cross-platform
- Type: Plotting
- License: GNU GPLv2+
- Website: veusz.github.io

Veusz is a scientific plotting package. Veusz is a Qt application written in Python, PyQt and NumPy. It is freely available for anyone to distribute under the terms of the GPL. It is designed to produce publication-quality plots. The name should be pronounced as "views".

This program produces plots in popular vector image formats, including PDF, PostScript and SVG. It is cross-platform, working under Microsoft Windows, macOS and Unix/Linux.

Plots are built up from a set of plotting widgets which can be added to the document and whose properties are edited using a consistent interface. For example, graph widgets can be placed within a grid widget to create an array of graphs. Widgets include X-Y plots, functions, contours, box plots, polar plots, ternary plots, vector plots, data images, labels and a variety of shapes. Datasets can be read using standard formats such as CSV, HDF5 or FITS, or entered, edited or created using functions from existing datasets. Functions can also be fitted to data.

Veusz is extensible with Python plugins. Plugins can be added for importing data in other formats, automating operations and creating different kinds of mathematical relationships between datasets. The program also provides a command line and scripting interface (based on Python) to its plotting facilities. The saved file format is a simple Python text script, which makes it easy to create plots from other programs.

Veusz was reviewed by Linux Format magazine, saying that "There's plenty of scope for creating colourful, engaging graphics". It was also included in their "Hot Pics" selection on their cover disc. Veusz can also be used as a drawing backend for the SciTools Easyviz package.
