= Puddletag =

Tag editor for Unix-like operating systems

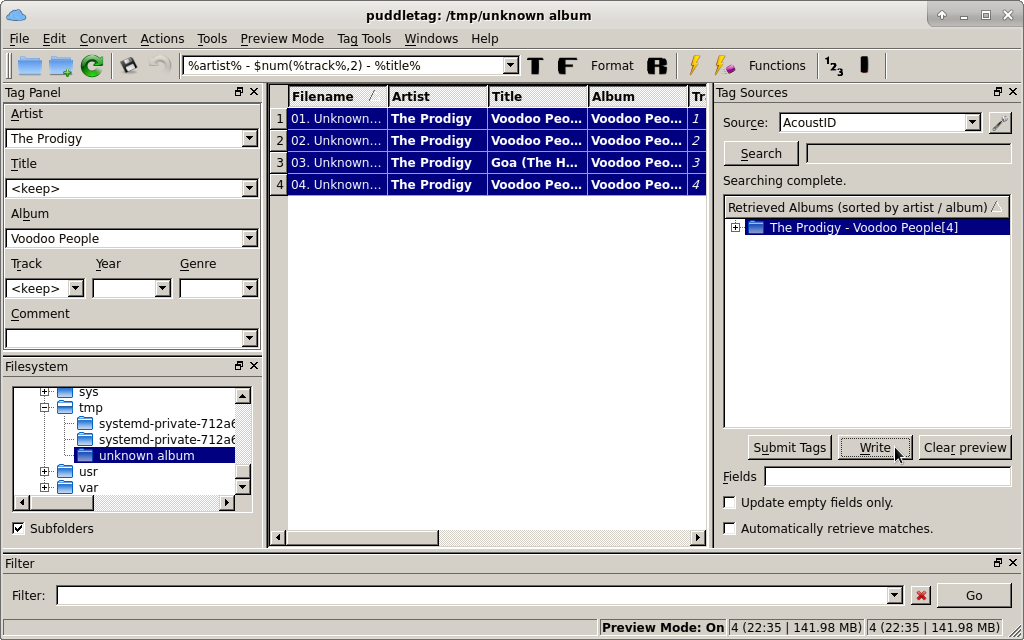
- Puddletag 1.2.0 on LXQt
- Initial release: July 13, 2008; 17 years ago
- Stable release: 2.4.0 (June 23, 2024; 18 months ago) [±]
- Repository: github.com/puddletag/puddletag
- Written in: Python
- Operating system: Unix-like
- Platform: PyQt
- Available in: English, Dutch, French, German, Portuguese (Brazilian), Russian, Czech
- Type: Tag editor
- License: GPLv3
- Website: docs.puddletag.net

Puddletag is a graphical audio file metadata editor ("tagger") for Unix-like operating systems.

It is free and open-source software subject to the terms of the GNU General Public License (GPL) version 3. In most major desktop Linux distributions, it is available from standard package repositories. Under Arch Linux(-based ones) it can be obtained from user repositories.

The user interface is modeled after the popular Windows freeware Mp3tag. It uses a spreadsheet-like layout so that all the tags a user may want to edit by hand are visible and easily editable. All the other audio taggers available for Linux take a different approach to user interface design. The interface elements can be freely arranged.

In July 2008, the first version (0.1) was released via SourceForge. The website counted several thousand downloads for each release before the project finally left the platform in early 2016 and was included in the package sources of most major Linux distributions. Version 1.0 was released in 2012, introducing support for AcoustID.

Puddletag is written in Python and uses Qt 5 (through PyQt) for its graphical user interface. As backend it utilizes Mutagen, a Python module to handle audio metadata.

== Features ==
Mutagen supports ASF, FLAC, M4A, APE, MP3, MPC, Ogg Opus, Ogg FLAC, Ogg Speex, Ogg Theora, Ogg Vorbis, True Audio, WavPack, OptimFROG, and AIFF audio files. All versions of ID3v2 are supported, and all standard ID3v2.4 frames are parsed. It can read Xing headers to accurately calculate the bitrate and length of MP3s. ID3 and APEv2 tags can be edited regardless of audio format. It can also manipulate Ogg streams on an individual packet/page level.

Puddletag includes support for the following audio formats: AAC, MP4 (mp4/m4a/m4b/iTunes compatible), OGG, OptimFROG OFR, OFS, SPX, TAK, TTA, WMA, WV.

- Batch Tag Editing. Write ID3v1.1, ID3v2.3, ID3v2.4, MPEG-4, WMA, APEv2 Tags and Vorbis comments to multiple files at once.
- Full Unicode support
- Support for embedded album cover art
- Automatically creates playlists
- Recursive subfolder support
- User-defined field mappings
- Remove parts of a tag or the entire tag from multiple files
- Rename and/or move files and folders based on the tag information
- Import tags from filenames, text files and clipboard
- Quick search and replace text in highlighted tracks/fields without having to resort to actions
- Format tags and filenames
- Replace characters or words from tags and filenames
- Regular expressions
- Export tag information to user-defined formats (i.e. HTML, RTF, CSV, XML, TXT AND JSON)
- Import tag information from online databases like freedb, Discogs, MusicBrainz AcoustID or Amazon (also by text-search)
- Full AcoustID integration
- Import tag information from local freedb databases
- Support for ID3v2.3 (ISO-8859-1 and UTF-16) and ID3v2.4 with UTF-8
- Automated Mass Tagging of multiple albums including the ability to enrich existing metadata using one or more metadata sources in a single operation
- Single Album and Mass Album Tagging results can be accepted/edited/rejected at track and/or field level

== See also ==
- List of tag editors
- ID3
- M3U
