= VisualSVN Server =

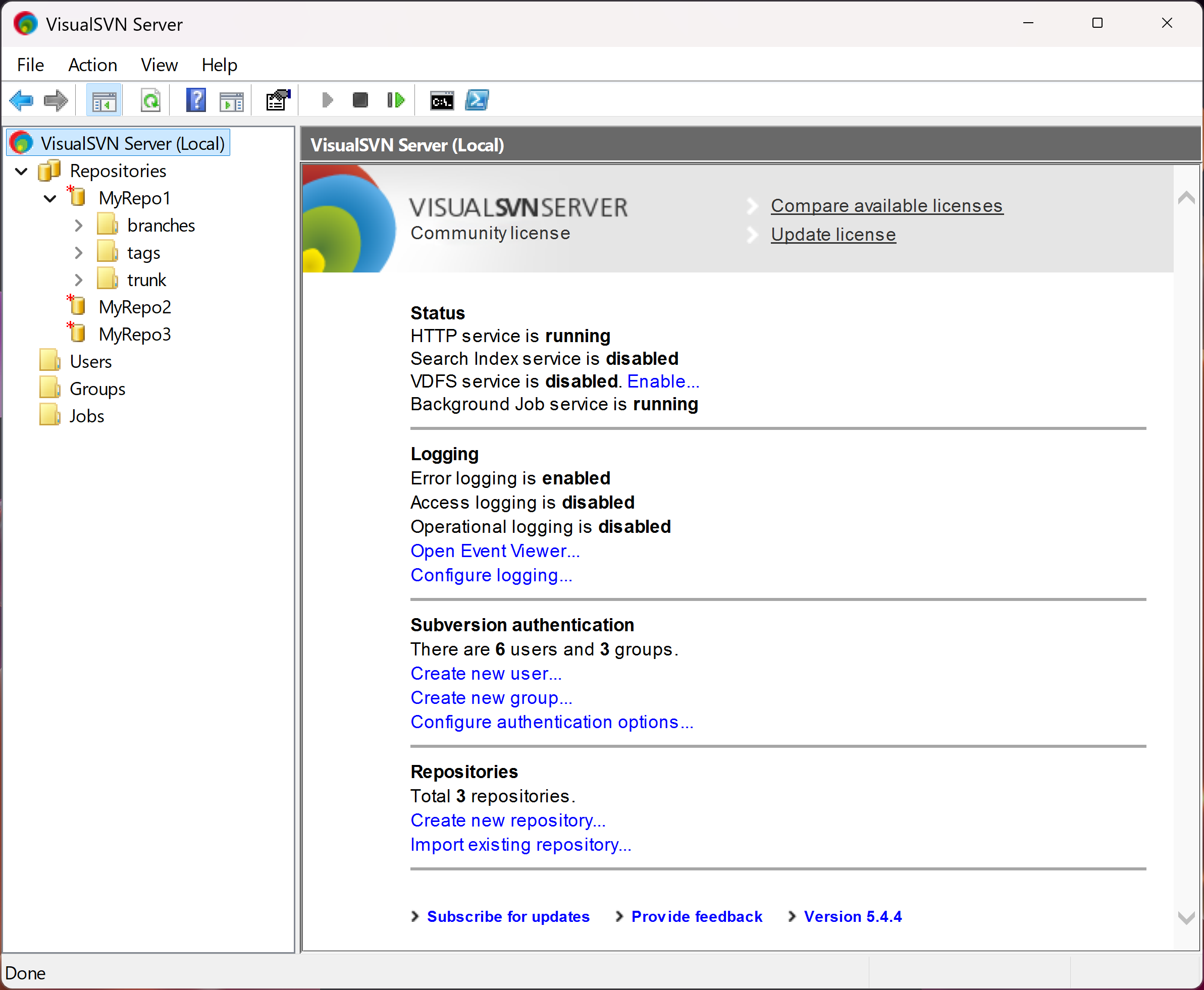
- VisualSVN Server Manager 5.4.4
- Developer: Axiorema
- Release: November 15, 2007; 18 years ago
- Stable release: 6.0.0 / November 12, 2026; 0 days ago
- Operating system: Microsoft Windows
- Type: version control, Subversion server
- License: Proprietary software Community license: Freeware; Essential, Enterprise, Enterprise Multinode: Trialware
- Website: www.visualsvn.com

VisualSVN Server is a software package that provides an Apache Subversion server for the Microsoft Windows platform. It is designed to simplify the process of installing, configuring, and managing a Subversion server in Windows environments. The software is commonly used for version control in software development, particularly in organizations utilizing Microsoft technologies.

VisualSVN Server received the Gold award in the Visual Studio Magazine Reader's Choice Awards in the ALM, SCM, and Requirements Management category in 2024, 2023, 2022, 2021, and 2019.

VisualSVN Server is used in development of Ecopath with Ecosim open-source project.

== Overview ==
VisualSVN Server bundles the Subversion version control system with a graphical user interface and adds functionality not available in the standard Subversion distribution. It provides an alternative to manually installing and configuring Subversion alongside the Apache HTTP Server.

The package includes an HTTP(S) service based on Apache HTTP Server for repository access, a web-based repository browser, and a Microsoft Management Console (MMC) snap-in called VisualSVN Server Manager. The management console enables configuration of the server, repositories, user accounts, and access permissions.

VisualSVN Server supports integration with Active Directory, including access control based on domain accounts and support for Integrated Windows Authentication. Additional features include a PowerShell module for administrative automation, repository replication for multi-site deployments, full-text search capabilities, and integrated backup functionality.

== History ==
VisualSVN Server was developed in response to demand from users of the VisualSVN plug-in for an easier method to install and manage Subversion servers on the Windows platform.

The first public release of VisualSVN Server occurred in 2007. At the time, it was the only all-in-one Subversion package that significantly simplified server installation, configuration, maintenance, and upgrades.

Over the years, the product has received regular updates. It is actively maintained, with updates providing new features, fixes, and support for new Windows versions and Subversion releases.

The product was renamed Axiorema VisualSVN Server in 2025 following the introduction of Axiorema as the company's new parent brand name.

== See also ==
- Apache Subversion
