= List of content management systems =

Content management systems (CMS) are used to organize and facilitate collaborative content creation. Many of them are built on top of separate content management frameworks. The list is limited to notable services.

== Open source software ==
This section lists free and open-source software that can be installed and managed on a web server.

Development discontinued.

Name	Platform	Supported databases	Latest stable release	Licenses	Latest release date	First public release date
Alchemy CMS	Ruby on Rails	MariaDB, PostgreSQL, SQLite	7.4.8	BSD	2025-08-15[±]	June 2010
Alfresco Community Edition	Java	MariaDB, MySQL, Oracle, PostgreSQL, SQL Server	26.2	LGPLv3	2026-07-30[±]	November 2005
Ametys CMS	Java	Derby, MySQL, Oracle, PostgreSQL	4.8.4	Apache 2.0	2024-02-13[±]	2003
Apache Roller	Java	HSQL, MySQL, Oracle, SQL Server, IBM Db2, PostgreSQL, Derby	6.1.6	Apache 2.0	2026-09-24[±]	
Apache Sling CMS	Java	JCR	1.1.8	Apache 2.0	2023-11-05	27 August 2007
ATutor	PHP	MySQL	2.2.4	GNU GPL	2018-06-20[±]	2002
b2evolution	PHP	MySQL, MariaDB	7.2.5	GNU GPLv2	2022-08-06[±]	2003
Backdrop CMS	PHP	MySQL, MariaDB	1.35.0	GNU GPL	2026-09-15[±]	15 January 2015
Bloomreach Experience Manager	Java	MySQL, Oracle, PostgreSQL, SQL Server	17.1.0	Apache 2.0	2026-06-18	2009
blosxom	Perl	Flat-file database	2.1.2	MIT	2008-10-02	
Bolt (CMS)	PHP	MySQL, MariaDB, SQLite	6.1.4	MIT	2026-07-05[±]	2012
Bricolage	Perl on mod_perl	MySQL, PostgreSQL, Oracle	2.0.1	BSD	2011-02-09	
C1 CMS	ASP.NET (Web Forms, MVC)	XML, SQL Server	6.13 Update 1	Mozilla Public License	2024-10-04[±]	January 2009
CMS Made Simple	PHP	MySQL	2.2.23	GNU GPL	2026-08-13; 2 months ago	July 2004
CMSimple	PHP	Flat-file database	5.15	GNU GPLv3	2024-03-25; 2 years ago	
Composr CMS	PHP	MySQL	10.0.45	CPAL	2024-01-27	20 June 2004
Concrete CMS	PHP	MySQL, MariaDB	9.4.2	MIT	2025-07-01	30 September 2008
ContentBox Modular CMS	Lucee, Railo, ColdFusion	MySQL, SQL Server, Hypersonic SQL, Derby, PostgreSQL, Oracle	6.0.0	Apache or proprietary	2023-12-20[±]	8 February 2012
django CMS	Python/Django	MariaDB, MySQL, Oracle, PostgreSQL, SQLite	5.0.13	BSD	2026-09-24; 49 days ago	May 2007
DokuWiki	PHP	Flat-file database	2026-07-14c	GNU GPL	2026-09-02; 24 months ago	4 July 2004
Dotclear	PHP	MariaDB, MySQL, PostgreSQL, SQLite	2.34	GNU GPL	2024-05-17[±]	2002
dotCMS	Java	PostgreSQL, SQL Server	25.07.28-1	BSL 1.1	2025-07-30	1 January 2009
DNN	ASP.NET (Web Forms, MVC)	SQL Server, SQL Server Express, SQL Azure	9.13.8	MIT	2025-03-05 [±]	24 December 2002
Drupal	PHP	MariaDB, Microsoft SQL Server, MySQL, Percona Server, PostgreSQL, SQLite	11.4.1	GNU GPLv2+	2026-07-03; 4 months ago	15 January 2001
DSpace	Java	Oracle, PostgreSQL	10.1	BSD	2026-09-14; 59 days ago	November 2002
Enonic XP	Java	Embedded NoSQL	7.16.0	GNU GPLv3	2025-12-01[±]	17 February 2015
EPrints	Perl on mod_perl	MySQL, MariaDB	3.4.7	GNU GPL	2025-08-29[±]	2000
eZ Publish	PHP	MySQL, MariaDB, PostgreSQL, SQLite, Oracle	6.0.9	GNU GPL	2025-06-10	1999
Fedora Commons	Java	MariaDB, MySQL, PostgreSQL	7.0.0	Apache License	2026-04-16; 6 months ago[±]	16 May 2003
Foswiki	Perl	Flat-file database	2.1.11	GNU GPL	2026-03-15[±]	9 January 2009
Geeklog	PHP	MariaDB, MySQL, PostgreSQL	2.2.2	GNU GPL	2022-09-22; 4 years ago[±]	
GetSimple CMS	PHP	Flat-file database	3.3.16	GNU GPL	2020-03-03	2009
Ghost	Node.js	SQLite, MySQL	6.7.0	MIT	2025-11-07	14 October 2013
Grav	PHP	Flat-file database	1.7.52	MIT	2026-04-29[±]	30 July 2014
Ibexa DXP	PHP	MySQL, MariaDB, PostgreSQL	5.0.10	GNU GPL	2026-08-20[±]	15 December 2015
Ikiwiki	Perl	Git (software), Apache Subversion, Mercurial	3.20260201	GNU GPL	2026-02-01[±]	29 April 2006
ImpressCMS	PHP	MariaDB, MySQL	2.0.3	GNU GPLv2	2026-04-13[±]	January 2008
ImpressPages	PHP	MySQL	5.0.3	GNU GPL MIT	2017-07-11[±]	September 2009
Jahia Community Distribution	Java	Derby, MariaDB, MySQL, Oracle, SQL Server, PostgreSQL	8.2.2	GNU GPL	2025-07-25	
Jamroom	PHP	MySQL, MariaDB, Percona	7.0.3	MPL	2026-03-15[±]	July 2003
Joomla!	PHP	MySQL, MariaDB, PostgreSQL	6.1.4	GNU GPL	2026-09-29; 44 days ago	17 August 2005
Known	PHP	MariaDB, MongoDB, MySQL	1.6.4	Apache License	2026-03-01	
LogicalDOC Community Edition	Java	MariaDB, MySQL	8.9.1	GNU LGPL	2024-06-20	2008
Magento	PHP	MySQL, MariaDB	2.4.9	OSL Ver. 3, AFL Ver. 3	2026-05-12[±]	31 March 2008
Magnolia	Java	PostgreSQL, Derby, H2, MySQL, Oracle, SQL Server	6.4.1	GNU GPL & proprietary	2025-12-11; 11 months ago	15 November 2003
Mambo	PHP	MySQL	4.6.5	GNU GPL	2008-06-01	2002
Mayan EDMS	Python (Django)	PostgreSQL	4.12.1	GNU GPL v2	2026-08-21; 2 months ago	3 February 2011
MediaWiki	PHP	MySQL, MariaDB, PostgreSQL, SQLite	1.46.1	GNU GPL	2026-10-01; 42 days ago	25 January 2002
Microweber	PHP	MySQL, PostgreSQL, SQLite	2.0.20	Apache License	2025-08-14	April 2015
Midgard CMS	PHP (Midgard framework)	MySQL	12.0.9.2	GNU LGPL	2012-09-26	8 May 1999
MODX	PHP	MySQL, MariaDB, Percona Server	3.1.2	GNU GPL	2025-04-02[±]	2004
MoinMoin	Python	Flat-file database	1.9.11	GNU GPL	2020-11-08; 6 years ago	29 July 2000
mojoPortal	ASP.NET	SQL Server, MySQL, SQL Azure, PostgreSQL, SQLite	2.9.0.1	EPL	2023-07-24[±]	2004
Movable Type	Perl, mod_perl, FastCGI, w/PHP	MySQL	9.0.9	GNU GPL	2026-06-24	8 October 2001
nopCommerce	ASP.NET (MVC)	SQL Server, MySQL, PostgreSQL	5.00.1	GNU General Public License	2026-11-09; 3 days ago	October 2008
Novius OS	PHP	MySQL	5.0.1 (Elche)	GNU Affero GPL	2014-07-08	December 2011
Nucleus CMS	PHP	MySQL	3.64	GNU GPL	2011-03-14	2002
Nuxeo EP	Java	MariaDB, MongoDB, MySQL, Oracle, PostgreSQL, SQL Server	LTS 2023.19	Apache 2.0	2024-12-05	2000
Omeka	PHP	MariaDB, MySQL	3.2	GNU GPL	2025-08-28[±]	21 February 2008
OpenACS	Tcl AOLserver	PostgreSQL, Oracle	5.10.1	GNU GPL	2024-09-03	
OpenCart	PHP	MariaDB, MySQL, Percona Server, PostgreSQL	4.1.0.4	GNU	2026-08-11; 3 months ago	April 2010
OpenCms	Java	MariaDB, MySQL, AS400, IBM Db2, HSQLDB, Oracle, PostgreSQL, SQL Server	21	GNU LGPL	2026-04-14[±]	2000
OpenKM Community Edition	Java	MariaDB, MySQL, PostgreSQL, Oracle, SQL Server	6.3.13	GNU GPL	2026-02-03	November 2005
OpenWGA	Java	MySQL, PostgreSQL, HSQLDB, SQL Server, Oracle, IBM Db2, IBM Lotus Domino	7.11.6.0	GNU GPL & proprietary	2024-11-06[±]	2001
Orchard Project	ASP.NET (Web Forms, MVC)	MariaDB, MySQL, PostgreSQL, SQLite, SQL Server	1.11.0	BSD 3-clause	2026-01-13[±]	January 2011
Phire CMS	PHP	MySQL	2.1.0	BSD 3-clause	2016-07-07	1 November 2010
PHP-Fusion	PHP	MySQL	9.10.30	GNU Affero GPL	2022-09-01[±]	12 April 2003
PHP-Nuke	PHP	MySQL	8.4.5	GNU GPL	2022-10-08	August 1998
phpWebLog	PHP	MySQL	0.5.3	GNU GPL	2001-10-31	
PhpWiki	PHP	MySQL, MariaDB, PostgreSQL, SQLite, Oracle, Berkeley DB, Flat-file database	1.6.6	GNU GPL	2025-05-05	December 1999
Pixie (CMS)	PHP	MySQL	1.0.4	GNU GPL	2010-03-21	May 2008
Plone	Python/Zope	PostgreSQL	6.2.3	GNU GPL	2026-11-10; 2 days ago	2001
PmWiki	PHP	Flat-file database SQLite	2.7.8	GNU GPL	2026-10-24[±]	January 2002
Prestashop	PHP	MySQL, MariaDB	9.2.1	Open Software License 3.0	2026-11-09; 3 days ago[±]	2007
ProcessWire	PHP	MariaDB, MySQL	3.0.260	Mozilla Public License 2.0	2026-10-30[±]	2007
Sellerdeck eCommerce	Perl	Flat-file database	16.0.3	GNU GPL	2017-02-20	1996
Serendipity	PHP + Smarty	MariaDB, MySQL, PostgreSQL, SQLite	2.6.0	BSD	2026-04-10[±]	2002
Shopware Community Edition	PHP, JavaScript	MariaDB, MySQL	6.6.10.3	MIT	2025-04-08	2010
Silverstripe CMS	PHP	MariaDB, Microsoft SQL Server, MySQL, PostgreSQL, SQLite	6.2.0	BSD	2026-04-17[±]	
SPIP	PHP	MariaDB, MySQL, SQLite	4.4.30	GNU GPL	2026-11-05; 24 months ago	July 2001
Textpattern	PHP	MySQL, MariaDB	4.9.2	GNU GPL	2026-11-02[±]	19 March 2003
TiddlyWiki	Node.js & client-side JavaScript	Flat-file database	5.4.0	BSD	2026-04-20; 6 months ago	30 September 2004
Tiki Wiki CMS Groupware	PHP	MySQL, MariaDB	27.1	GNU LGPL	2024-11-23; 23 months ago	7 October 2002
TWiki	Perl	Plain files (under version control)	6.1.0	GNU GPL	2018-07-16[±]	23 July 1998
TYPO3	PHP	MySQL, MariaDB, PostgreSQL, SQLite	14.3.2	GNU GPL	2026-05-26; 5 months ago	1998
Umbraco	ASP.NET (Web Forms, MVC)	SQL Server, SQL CE	17.3.5	MIT	2026-04-30[±]	2000
Wagtail	Python/Django	MariaDB, MySQL, PostgreSQL, SQLite	8.1	BSD	2026-11-02; 10 days ago	February 2014
WebGUI	Perl on mod_perl	MySQL	7.10.30	GNU GPL	2016-01-06	2001
Wiki.js	Node.js	PostgreSQL, MariaDB, MySQL, SQL Server, SQLite	3.3.1	GNU Affero GPL	2026-11-11; 32 hours ago	12 September 2016
WordPress	PHP	MySQL, MariaDB	7.1.4	GNU GPL	2026-10-28; 15 days ago	27 May 2003
XOOPS	PHP	MySQL, MariaDB	2.5.11	GNU GPL	2023-12-24[±]	
XWiki	Java	HSQLDB, MariaDB, MySQL, PostgreSQL, Oracle	18.9.0	GNU LGPL	2026-10-26[±]	January 2004

== Software as a service (SaaS) ==
This section lists proprietary software that includes software, hosting, and support with a single vendor. This section includes free services.

Name	Licensed version available	Last stable version	Web content management	Group content management	Enterprise content management
Adobe Business Catalyst		V4 End Of Life 2021/03/26	Yes	Yes	Yes
Alfresco Cloud	Yes (Alfresco Community & Enterprise)	2012.05	No	Yes	Yes
censhare	Yes	2017.02	Yes	Yes	Yes
Contentful	Yes (Community, Team, Enterprise)	Versionless	Yes	Yes	Yes
CoreMedia Content Cloud	Yes	v13	Yes	Yes	Yes
Cloud CMS	Yes	3.2.89	Yes	Yes	Yes
dotCMS Cloud	Yes	5.2.4	Yes	Yes	Yes
Microsoft 365	Yes (MS SharePoint, MS Lync, MS Exchange, MS Office)	2013	Yes	Yes	Yes
O3Spaces	Yes	3.2.1	Yes	Yes	No
OpenKM Cloud	Yes	6.4.48	Yes	Yes	Yes
Oracle Content Management	Yes	Oracle Content Management 22.6.1	Yes	Yes	Yes
Omni CMS	Yes	2022.3.1	Yes	Yes	Yes
uCoz			Yes	Yes	No
Umbraco Cloud	Yes	10.1.0	Yes	Yes	Yes
Windows Live	No	2011	No	Yes	No
Zesty.io	Yes (Multi-Tenant SaaS)	Versionless	Yes	Yes	Yes
Webflow		2022	Yes		Yes
BLOX CMS			Yes	Yes	Yes

== Proprietary software ==
This section lists proprietary software to be installed and managed on a user's own server. This section includes freeware proprietary software.

Systems listed on a light purple background are no longer in active development.

Name	Platform	Supported databases	Latest stable release	Licenses	First public release date	Latest release date	Web content management	Group web content management	Enterprise content management
Adobe Experience Manager (formerly Day CQ5)	Java	JCR (Apache Jackrabbit Oak), MongoDB	6.4.2	Proprietary	October 24, 2012	2018-10	Yes	Yes	Yes
Alfresco (Enterprise & Community Edition)	Java	Oracle, SQL Server, MySQL, PostgreSQL, IBM Db2	4.0.2 Enterprise, 4.2.c Community	Proprietary, LGPL	November 2005	2015-03	No	Yes	Yes
Altitude3.Net	ASP.NET	SQL Server	2015.07.14	Proprietary	June 1, 2000	2015-07-14	Yes	Yes	Yes
censhare	Java	Oracle	2017.2	Proprietary	2002	2017-05-12	Yes	Yes	Yes
Contentverse	Java	Oracle, SQL Server	8.1	Proprietary	October 8, 2013	2014	Yes	Yes	Yes
CoreMedia Content Cloud	Java	JDBC-compliant databases, MongoDB	v13	Proprietary		2025-10-01	Yes	Yes	Yes
dotCMS	Java	Oracle, SQL Server, MySQL, PostgreSQL	25.07.28-1	Proprietary	January 1, 2009	2025-07-30	Yes	Yes	Yes
Episerver CMS	ASP.NET	SQL Server	11.14.2	Proprietary	1997	2020-02-24	Yes	Yes	Yes
IBM Enterprise Content Management	Java	Oracle, IBM Db2	8.5	Proprietary		2013	Yes	Yes	Yes
Jahia Enterprise Distribution	Java	MySQL, Oracle, PostgreSQL, Microsoft SQL Server	6.6.2.3	Proprietary	2002	2013-12-20	Yes	Yes	Yes
Movable Type	Perl	MySQL, Oracle, SQL Server	7.7.1	Proprietary	October 8, 2001	2021-05-27	Yes	Yes	Yes
Oracle WebCenter Content (formerly Universal Content Management)	Java	Oracle	12c	Proprietary		2019-10-07	Yes	Yes	Yes
Omni CMS	Java	MySQL, Microsoft SQL Server, SAP Sybase ASE	2022.3.1	Proprietary	1999	2022-12-12	Yes	Yes	Yes
Pimcore	PHP	AWS Aurora, MariaDB, MySQL, Percona Server	12.3.12.1	Proprietary (POCL)	2010	2026-08-07; 3 months ago[±]	Yes	Yes	Yes
Sitefinity	ASP.NET	SQL Server, Oracle, MySQL, Microsoft Azure SQL	13.2.7500	Proprietary		2020-12-08	Yes	Yes	Yes
Microsoft SharePoint	ASP.NET	SQL Server (2005, 2008, 2012, 2016, 2019), SQL Express	Subscription Edition (SE)	Proprietary, Open API	March 28, 2001	2021-11-02	Yes	Yes	Yes
OctoberCMS	PHP	MariaDB, MySQL, PostgreSQL, SQLite, SQL Server	v4.1.18	Proprietary	May 15, 2014	2026-03-15[±]			
OpenText Teamsite	Java, .Net, XML, XSLT	Oracle, SQL Server, IBM Db2, MySQL	16.2	Proprietary	1995	2017-04	Yes	Yes	Yes
Telligent Community	ASP.NET	SQL Server	5.0		2004	2009-06-26	Yes	Yes	No
Vialect	Java	Noodle	7.15.05		1994	2009-10-02	Yes	Yes	Yes

== Other content management frameworks ==
A content management framework (CMF) is a system that facilitates the use of reusable components or customized software for managing Web content. It shares aspects of a Web application framework and a content management system (CMS).

Below is a list of notable systems that claim to be CMFs.

Name	Technologies
Apache Jackrabbit	Java
AxKit	Perl
Open Semantic Framework	Drupal, OWL, PHP, and RDF

== See also ==
- Comparison of web frameworks
- Comparison of wiki software
