= AMPPS =

AMPPS is a solution stack of Apache, MySQL, MongoDB, PHP, Perl and Python for Windows NT, Linux and macOS. It comes with 419 PHP web applications, over 1000 PHP classes and 6 versions of PHP. AMPPS is created by Softaculous Ltd. a company founded in 2009 which makes the Softaculous Auto installer. AMPPS is used to develop on PHP, MySQL applications like WordPress, Joomla, and Drupal.

== Software list ==
- Prestashop
- Concrete5
- phpBB
- SMF
- DokuWiki
- Drupal
- eZ Publish
- Joomla
- Geeklog
- Liferay
- WAMP
- MAMP
- Magento
- Mantis Bug Tracker
- MediaWiki
- Moodle
- Pootle
- Limesurvey
- Redmine
- Subversion
- SugarCRM
- Trac
- WordPress
- MyBB
- Xoops
- b2evolution

The software has 419 PHP applications.

== See also ==
- List of installation software
