= Pixie (disambiguation) =

A pixie is a small humanoid creature in British folklore.

Pixie, pixies, or pixy may also refer to:

== Art, entertainment, and media ==
=== Books ===
- Pixy, a graphic novel by the Swedish cartoonist Max Andersson
- Pixie (comics), several comic book characters

=== Film and television ===
- Pixies (film), a 2015 animated film
- Pixie (film), a 2020 Irish comedy thriller film
- Pixie, one of the main characters of the animated television series Pixie and Dixie and Mr. Jinks
- The Pixies (The Fairly OddParents), a large group of fairy-like entities in the animated television series The Fairly OddParents
- "Pixies", an episode of the television series Mona the Vampire

=== Music ===
- Pixies (band), American alternative rock band (1986–1993, 2004–present)
  - Pixies (EP)
- Pixy (group), South Korean girl group formed in 2021
- Pixie (group), a Filipino girl group formed in 2024

== Computing and technology ==
- Pixie (CMS), content management system
- Pixie, a magnifying glass application included in Apple Developer Tools
- Palm Pixi, a smartphone developed by Palm

== Confections ==
- Pixies, a popular Fannie May confection consisting of caramel and pecans coated in milk chocolate
- Pixy Stix, a sugary candy in straw-like packaging

== Other uses ==
- Pixie (name), list of people with the name
- Pixie, a type of upper-atmospheric lightning
- Pixie cut, short layered women's hairstyle with a shaggy fringe
- Pixies, the common name for butterflies in the genus Melanis
- Pixie mandarin, a cultivar of Citrus reticulata

== See also ==
- Pixel
- PXE (disambiguation)
- Pyx
- Pixey, English indie pop musician
- Particle-induced X-ray emission (PIXE), a technique for analyzing the composition of materials
