= ImpressPages =

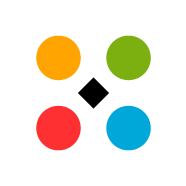
- Developer: ImpressPages
- Release: September 2009
- Stable release: 5.0.3 / 2017-07-11[±]
- Written in: PHP
- Available in: Multilingual
- Type: Content Management System
- License: GPL; MIT
- Website: impresspages.org
- Repository: github.com/impresspages/ImpressPages-CMS

ImpressPages is an open-source PHP framework with built-in content editor. Features include MVC engine, inline editing and drag&drop interface. It is distributed under the GNU GPL v.3.0 and MIT licences.

The first stable version of ImpressPages came out in 2009. As of April 2014, version 4.0 has been released marking the shift from CMS to a PHP framework.

== History ==
ImpressPages was developed by three Lithuanian entrepreneurs — Audrius Jankauskas, Mangirdas Skripka, and Mindaugas Stankaitis. The idea was born in 2007, and after two years of development, ImpressPages alpha was released. In 2011, ImpressPages participated at the business accelerator "Difference Engine" which led to an investment from a venture capital fund Practica Capital in 2013.

=== Release history ===
2009 Sep - ImpressPages alpha
2013 Oct - ImpressPages CMS 3.6 with Theme Marketplace
2013 Oct - ImpressPages CMS 3.7
2013 Nov - ImpressPages CMS 3.8
2013 Dec - ImpressPages CMS 3.9
2014 Apr - ImpressPages 4.0
2014 Jun - ImpressPages 4.1 with Plugin Marketplace
2014 Sep - ImpressPages 4.2
2014 Nov - ImpressPages 4.3
2014 Dec - ImpressPages 4.4
2015 Jan - ImpressPages 4.5
2015 Mar - ImpressPages 4.6
2016 Aug - ImpressPages 4.7
2016 Oct - ImpressPages 4.8

=== Awards ===
In 2011, ImpressPages won a Packt Most Promising Open-Source Project Award.

== Features ==
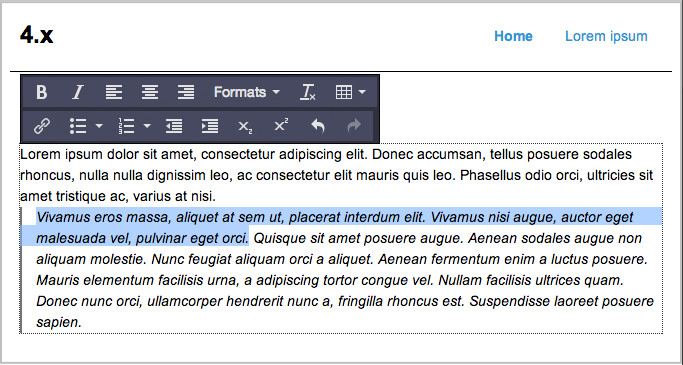
ImpressPages 4.0 Inline editing

- Inline editing

Pages are edited in a WYSIWYG way. By browsing through the website users can edit content by clicking on the inserted fields.

ImpressPages 4.0 Drag&drop column widget

- Drag&drop

Page layout management is based on drag&drop. Widgets can be put to the page by drag&dropping them into desired places.

- Widgets

Most common widgets are prepared in default installation: Heading, Text, Image, Gallery, Video, Divider, Map, File, HTML, Form. A full list with descriptions is here.

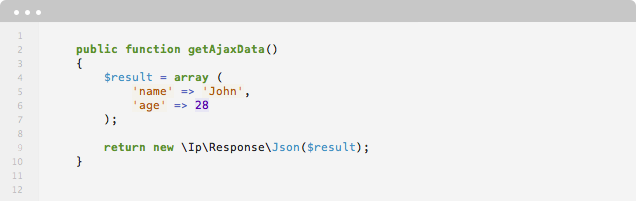
ImpressPages 4.0 MVC engine

- MVC engine

ImpressPages 4.0 has a MVC engine providing users with MVC, routing, template helpers, url generation, DB layer (and PDO), PSR standards-compliant class naming and autoloader.

- Themes

Both free and paid-for themes are available via the ImpressPages marketplace, allowing users to quickly apply different styling to a website without touching HTML or PHP code.

- Multi-language support and translations

ImpressPages is multi-lingual by default, no plugins are needed to make the website international.

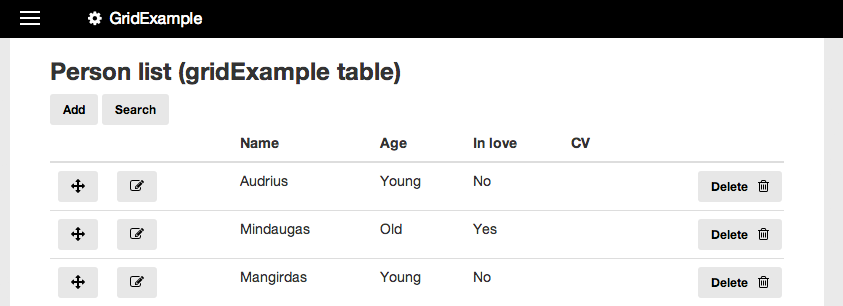
ImpressPages 4.0 Grid

- Grid

A helper to create CRUD interface for records in the database.

== Community ==
The ImpressPages community is based in GitHub and Stackoverflow.

Developers can contribute plugins via GitHub. Q&A section can be found on Stackoverflow with the tag "impresspages". User contributed themes are listed in the Theme Marketplace.

== See also ==
- List of content management systems
- Comparison of web frameworks
