= Backdrop =

Backdrop or Backdrops may refer to:

- Backdrop (theater), painted scenery hung at the back of a stage
- Backdrop (wrestling), various types of throws in amateur and professional wrestling
- Painted photography backdrops, used in studio photography circa 1860–1920
- Backdrop CMS, a website content management system
