= C1 CMS =

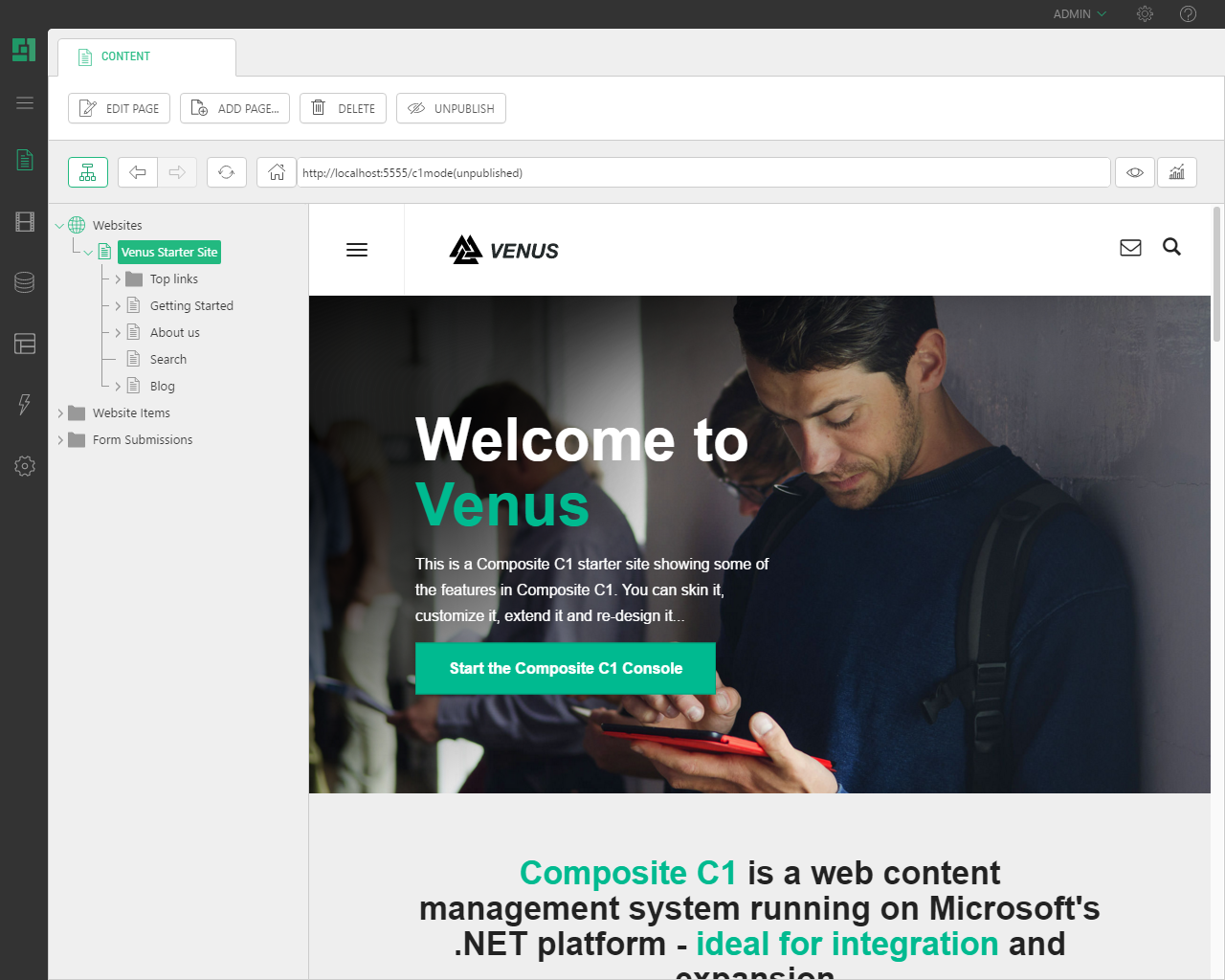
- Screenshot
- Stable release: 6.13 Update 1 / 2024-10-04[±]
- Written in: C# / JavaScript / ASP.NET Razor / ASP.NET Web Forms / XSLT
- Operating system: Microsoft Windows / Windows Azure
- Type: Web content management system
- License: Mozilla Public License
- Website: cms.orckestra.com

C1 CMS (formerly Composite C1 & Orckestra CMS) is a free open source .NET-based web content management system.

The same version is available under both the MPL 1.1 license and C1 CMS's commercial license.

C1 CMS can be regarded as a CMS without database by default with an option of migrating its data store to a Microsoft SQL Server database. As the CMS without database it uses XML files for its data store.

The CMS has an open pluggable architecture.

== History ==
C1 CMS development began mid-2007, it reached version 1.0 in January 2009 and until September 2010 was sold as a commercially licensed product, primarily to customers in Northern Europe.

On 29 September 2010, Composite released C1 version 2.0 as free open source software under the Mozilla Public License, pledging to continue development on the free core and providing paid services.

In October 2010, Composite C1 was added to the .NET 4 enabled parts of Microsoft's Web App Gallery (Web Platform Installer 3 and WebMatrix).

In March 2011, Composite C1 version 2.1 was released, making SQL Server support part of the open source project.

In December 2011, Composite C1 version 3.0 was released, improving on the developer and content editor user experience and adding ASP.NET Razor as a layout template technology option.

In January 2012, Composite C1 version 3.1 (called a "service release"), adding support for spell checking (when using Mozilla Firefox with dictionaries installed) and .less files.

In April 2012, Composite C1 version 3.2 was released, adding "Save and Publish" combo button, support for plugging in external media data bases (like SharePoint or images from Facebook), HTML5 video streaming. It is compatible with .NET Framework 4.5 and Visual Studio 2012.

In July 2013, more than a year since the last release, Composite C1 4.0 was released that is considered the 2nd big milestone release since Composite C1 open-sourced in October 2010, adding end-user features such as the block selector, searchable drop-downs, freehand image resizing, new Starter sites, as well as developer features such as built-in Razor and User Control functions, Razor and Master Page templates, page template features, data tree ordering.

In November 2013, Composite C1 version 4.1 was released, adding drag-and-drop for images and files from the desktop into page content, support for Composite Form Builder, Internet Explorer 11 support, a new "Static Datatypes" folder on the Data Perspective, a 100% customized UI for the "Function Call Editor" for custom C1 Functions, and many more.

In May 2014, Composite C1 version 4.2 was released, adding C1 Function previews in Visual Editor (showing an image of the rendered function rather than an abstract representation of "a macro"), simplified editing of C1 Function properties, a new responsive starter site called "Venus", iPad editing support, ASP.NET Razor 3.1.1 support and more. And in June 2014, version 4.2 update 1 was released, which contained a number of improvements and bug fixes and was a recommended update to 4.2.

In March 2015, version 4.3 was released, which featured scheduled data publishing, native content editing experience with RTL languages like Arabic, enhanced password policy options, image resizing options in Razor, hooking into ASP.NET Full Page Caching key generation and more.

In September 2015, Orckestra, a Canadian company that provides cloud-based commerce solutions, acquired Composite C1 CMS.

In December 2015, a new version of Composite C1 CMS was released - version 5.0. It features a brand new C1 Console GUI, visual content navigation, data item mapping, better MVC support and more.

As of version 5.3, released 18 October 2016, the name and branding for the product changed to Orckestra CMS.

5.4: This is a minor release, following up on v. 5.3, introducing support for bulk uploading files to the website file system, a small improvement to the hierarchical selector and a new command for Nightwatch.js API to test file uploads.

5.5. This is a service release with minor improvements that includes more stable CMS function previews in Visual Editor, a faster initial CMS setup and support for data updates by add-ons. Learn more

In February 2017, version 6.0 was released, CMS users now have built-in search in the console, visual components for much easier access to adding features and functions to content. Web developers can surface advanced faceted search, build components and use the new Container Class feature to tailor the user experience when editing content. At this point the name changed back to C1 CMS to refer back to the free open source C1 CMS i well known for.

In April 2017, v6.1 has been released. This is a minor release, primarily stabilizing the 6.0 release and bringing the Search features introduced as beta in 6.0 to release level in terms of stability, performance and features.

== Source code and community ratings ==
The source code and issue tracker for C1 CMS were moved to GitHub in October 2015. The discussion forums remain on the previous CodePlex site, which also contains user ratings and reviews.

== Features ==
C1 CMS comes with a large number of built-in features, including but not being limited to:

- Multilingual, UNICODE support
- Multiple document interface
- Publishing workflow
- Content security
- WYSIWYG editor
- XHTML compatible
- XSLT developer tooling
- .NET 4.5 and ASP.NET 4.5 based
- Transparent XML and SQL Server support via LINQ
- Side-by-side support for both ASP.NET Razor, ASP.NET Web Forms and ASP.NET MVC
- Support for templating using plain HTML, ASP.NET Razor, ASP.NET Master Pages and XSLT
- Run on Internet Information Services (IIS) 7, 7.5, 8, 8.5, WebMatrix, Visual Studio 2015, Microsoft Azure
- Support for Mozilla Firefox, Internet Explorer, Google Chrome. Firefox users have spell check features.

(This list is not exhaustive.)

More features are available via "packages" (extension modules or add-ons).

== Modules (packages) ==
Packages (also known as addons) are modules that extend the functionality of C1 CMS. They include, but are not limited to:

- Content versioning
- Newsletters
- Extranet
- Blog
- Page comments
- RSS / Twitter / YouTube feed readers
- XML to SQL Server migration
- Google Search (CSE) integration
- Microsoft Search Server integration
- Package Creator
- Data Forms Renderer
- ASP.NET MVC Player
- ASP.NET MVC Functions
- Network Load Balancing
- Social Media integrations (Facebook, Twitter, Google+)

(This list is not exhaustive.)

Most packages are free and distributed under the MPL 1.1. Some packages are commercial. The commercial packages can be purchased via an add-on market.

Both free and commercial packages can be installed from the administrative panel ("Console").

== C1 CMS and Microsoft Azure ==
C1 CMS can be hosted in Microsoft Azure:

- on a web site
- in a cloud service

C1 CMS can be installed from Microsoft Web App Gallery when creating a Microsoft Azure web site.

With the C1 CMS Azure service package, this CMS can be deployed in a web role in the cloud service.

== Administrative panel ==
The administrative panel in C1 CMS is called the "Console". It gives access to the back-end via the so-called "perspectives", sections of the administrative panel that group the back-end functionality of the specific purpose. There are 6 built-in perspectives:

- Content where websites, web site structures and web pages can be managed and edited
- Media where media files can be stored and managed
- Data where data types and data can be managed
- Layout where page templates can be created and managed
- Functions where additional functionality can be created by using ASP.NET Razor, XSLT, C# etc.
- System where other CMS-related functionality can be viewed and managed such as packages, website languages, hostname configuration, the server log etc.

The perspectives can be extended with other functionality as well as more perspectives can be added to the Console. Some packages - when installed - are available from their own perspective, for example, "Extranet" or "Package Creator".

== See also ==
- List of content management systems (CMS)
