= Altitude3.Net =

- Developer: Nmédia Solutions
- Initial release: June 1, 2000; 25 years ago
- Platform: .Net
- Type: Content Management System, Content Management Framework
- Website: altitude3.net

Altitude3.Net is an electronic business development platform that allows to create web and mobile systems along with interactive communication strategies. The platform has the same functionalities as a content management system (CMS) and communicates with other systems (accounting systems, manufacturing management software (MRP), business management software (enterprise resource planning (ERP)), database, Excel files, XML, CSV or all other kinds of structural data).

Nmédia solutions developed Altitude3.Net in 2001 using Microsoft's .NET Framework technology. The platform is currently using the 4.5 version of Microsoft's Framework.

== History ==
In 2001, Nmédia solutions created the content management system Altitude. As it went on, many versions were developed:

- Altitude Moto and Altitude Auto (2001 to 2006);
- Altitude 2 (2006);
- Altitude3.Net (2010).

== List of main functionalities ==
The Altitude3.Net platform is structured in many modules:

- Content management
- contact management and mass-emailing
- Control of advanced SEO parameters
- Microsoft flexibility & computability
- Security & access management
- Security & permission management
- E-commerce solutions: Centralized Product Management (CPM) services. This module includes several functionalities: interface for mass product modification, centralized coupon management, custom management by product group, inventory by store location, shopping cart, price & currency management, catalog management, centralized database, supplier management, product by media, product comparison tool (based on common characteristics), syncing accounting software inventory with Altitude3.Net
- A Microsoft Azure solution (cloud computing)
- Omnichannel marketing
- Other functionalities: On-site search engines for meta data and documents (text, Word, Excel and PDF); HTML5 video player with descending compatibility; Integrated functions enabling an entire site to be generated in Hypertext Markup Language (HTML) or enabling to export all its data (DATA) and import it in any other CMS

== Awards and recognitions ==
- In 2011: Nmédia solutions wins the title of Web Development Partner of the Year awarded by the Microsoft Partner Network.
- In 2012: Altitude3.Net wins the Prix Franco awarded by the Drummondville Young Chamber of Commerce during its annual gala.
- In 2015: The CPM module of Altitude3 is finalist in the Web Solutions category at the Octas.

== See also ==
- List of content management systems
