= Composr CMS =

Web application for creating websites

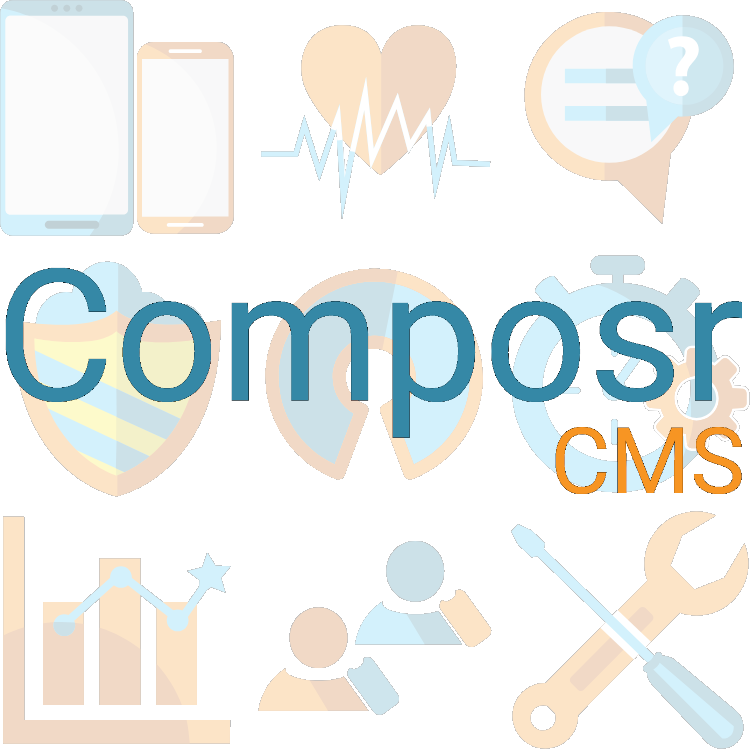
- Developer: Christopher Graham
- Initial release: March 1, 2004; 21 years ago
- Stable release: 10.0.52 / 2 August 2025; 4 months ago
- Preview release: 11 beta8 / 31 July 2025; 4 months ago
- Written in: PHP
- Operating system: Cross-platform
- Available in: Multilingual
- Type: Content management framework, Content management system, Community and Blog software
- License: Common Public Attribution License
- Website: compo.sr and composr.app

Composr CMS (or Composr) is a web application for creating websites. It is a combination of a Web content management system and Online community (Social Networking) software. Composr is licensed as free software and primarily written in the PHP programming language.

Composr is available on various web application distributions platforms, including Installatron, Softaculous, and Bitnami.

== History ==
Composr was launched in 2004 as ocPortal. In version 1, it started as a forum-friendly trailblazer which was expanded into a fully-functional CMS in version 2. Several UI/UX and system improvements were made over the proceeding versions.

ocPortal was featured on the CMS Report (a CMS editorial website) "Top 30 Web Applications" list.

The software remained ocPortal until version 9, and then it was renamed to Composr CMS alongside the new version 10 as a product and branding overhaul.

== Features ==
The main features are for the following:

- Content Management of website structure and pages
- Content Management of custom data ("Catalogues")
- Galleries (Photos and Videos)
- News and Blogging
- Discussion Forums
- Chat Rooms
- Advertising management ("Banners")
- Calendars
- File management ("Downloads")
- wikis ("Wiki+")
- Quizzes
- Newsletters
- Community Points

Composr uses a number of built-in languages to build up web content and structure, such as the following:

- Comcode (for creating high-level web content, similar to BBCode)
- Tempcode (a templating language)
- Filtercode (for defining content filtering)
- Selectcode (for defining content selection)

Composr is developed distinctly compared to most other Open Source CMSs, with the main distinctions being the following:

- Composr is module-orientated, rather than node-orientated
- Common software components are designed for maximum integration, rather than maximum choice

Some unique (or rare) features of Composr are:

- Automatic banning of hackers (if hacking attempts are detected)
- Core integration with spammer block lists
- Integration with third-party forum software for user accounts and forums (although this is no longer a focus)
- Automatic color scheme generation using color theory
- ATAG compliance

== Criticisms ==
Composr's primary weak point has been noted as its very small community and limited developer availability. Few community addons or themes have been released for Composr when compared to projects such as Drupal and Wordpress.

== See also ==
- List of content management systems
