= Novius OS =

Content management system

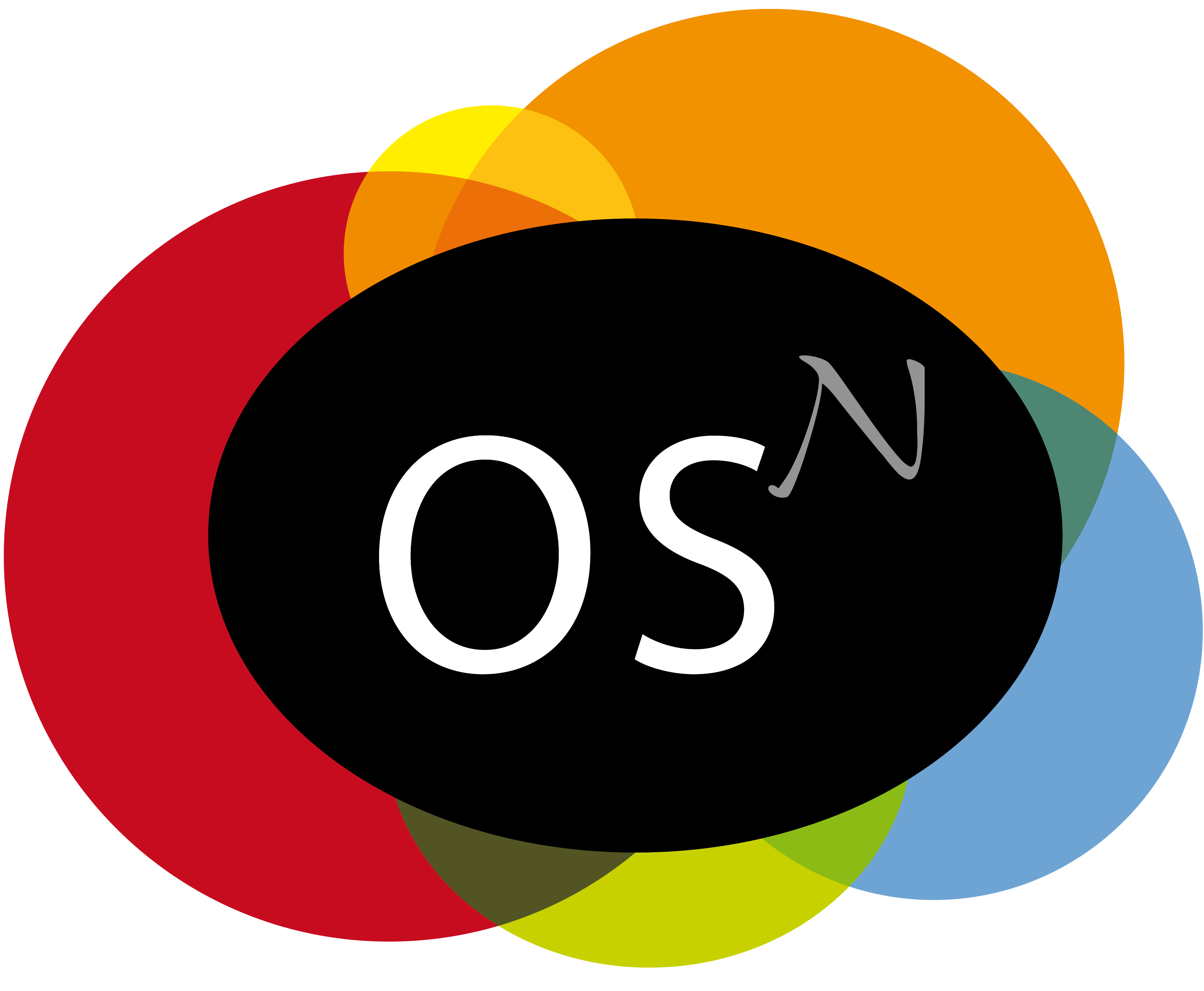
- Developer(s): Novius
- Stable release: 5.0.1 (Elche) / 30 July 2014; 11 years ago
- Written in: PHP
- Type: Content management system and Blog software
- Licence: GNU Affero General Public License
- Website: www.novius-os.org

Novius OS is a content management system (CMS) open source (Affero General Public License v3) designed for multi-channel Internet (Create Once Publish Everywhere) and published by the Novius company since 2011.

== History ==
The "Novius OS" project was launched by the company Novius in December 2011. The publishing company since 2004 a proprietary CMS, Publi-Nova, has decided to embark on open-source and create a new CMS designed for a multi-channel Internet.

Novius OS is distributed under the GNU AGPL v3 license and uses the latest web technologies. It is based on the framework and FuelPHP side interface uses HTML5, jQuery UI and Wijmo TinyMCE plugins.

Like the Android versions are named after dessert, major Novius OS versions are listed in alphabetical order and named after a city.

== Versions ==
The first stable version of OS Novius was launched in September 2012. It was the version 0.1 before being renamed "Amsterdam" a posteriori. This version included the expected standard elements of a CMS (publishing pages, blog entries, creating users, managing permissions) and the first notable features Novius OS such as specific business applications, the library, the multi-language and system of tabbed browsing makes multitasking CMS.

Version 0.2 was launched in February 2013 and it also has been known a posteriori "Berlin". This version brings the new CMS applications such as forms management, slide and application "Create my app" that allows developers to easily and quickly create a Novius OS application (database, UI, etc..). It also notes the emergence of multi-context for managing multiple sites and / or multiple languages – in a single back office.

The Chiba version was launched in April 2013 as a tribute to the work done by the Japanese community, which fully reflects Novius OS in Japanese. In this version, advanced rights system has been implemented and planning publications. The cache CMS has also been improved.

== Events ==
Novius OS won the contest Bar Camp to be exhibiting at the www2012, international gathering around the future challenges of the web, originally created by Robert Cailliau, co-founder with Tim Berners-Lee of the web. During the week, Novius OS was presented to several personalities giving a first echo in the project.

Novius OS was also present at CMS Day in 2012 and 2013, European rally around Open Source CMS.

== Features ==
- Multi-task interface available on tablet as on desktop. You can navigate between tabs without losing the content and save the workspace.
- One tool to manage multiple sites in different languages – Novius OS is natively multi-site, multi-lingual, it is possible to share content and media depending on the context or language.
- A media: media organization is like a regular file explorer. The library keeps high definition images versions and offers optimization for SEO.
- Developers: Novius OS provides developers with all the elements needed to build applications: Application Wizard, UI standardized internal and external connectors, theming.

== Technical data ==
Novius OS is available on GitHub. It runs on a LAMP stack and is written in PHP 5.3 on the MVC architecture. It uses the framework FuelPHP, its interfaces are using HTML5 and jQuery UI and Wijmo the library.

Novius OS is built on an application system and the image of the object-oriented programming, an application may be extended by others to be customized or extended with additional features. Each application has different components: launchers, enhancers, templates and data catchers that allow the flow of data between applications, but also from / to the outside.

In addition to native applications provided with Novius OS (e.g. Collections, Web pages), it is possible to create specific business applications using the wizard "Create My App". This wizard allows you to quickly and easily generate the basis for a new application: Models, fields and group fields, App Desk, launchers, enhancers URL, etc..

== Screenshots ==
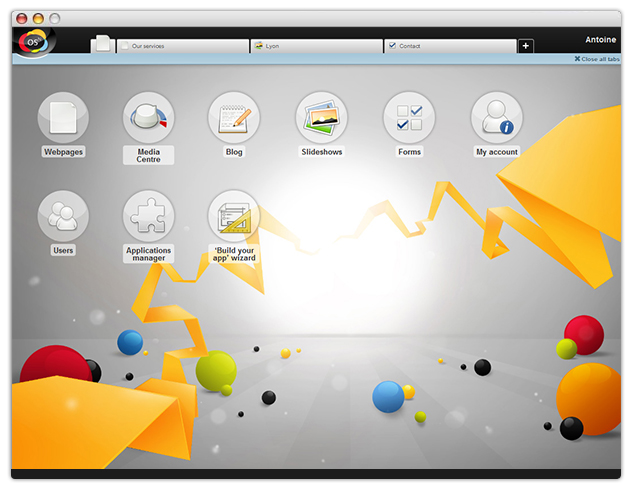
Novius OS's home

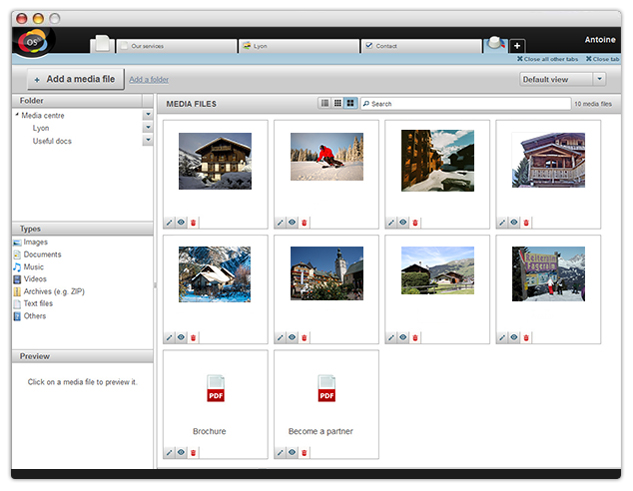
Media center application of Novius OS

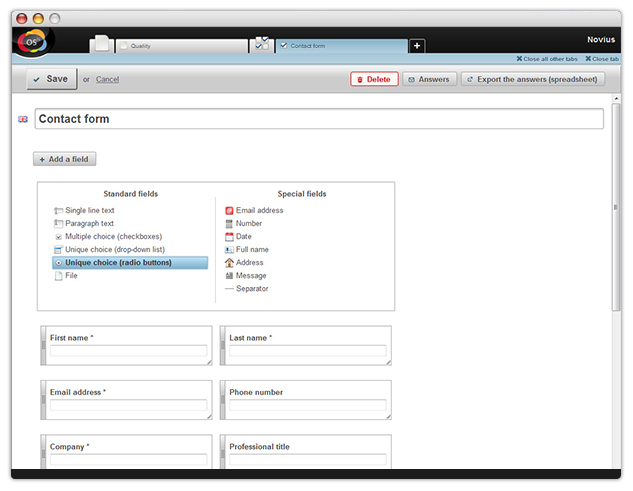
Application Form of Novius OS

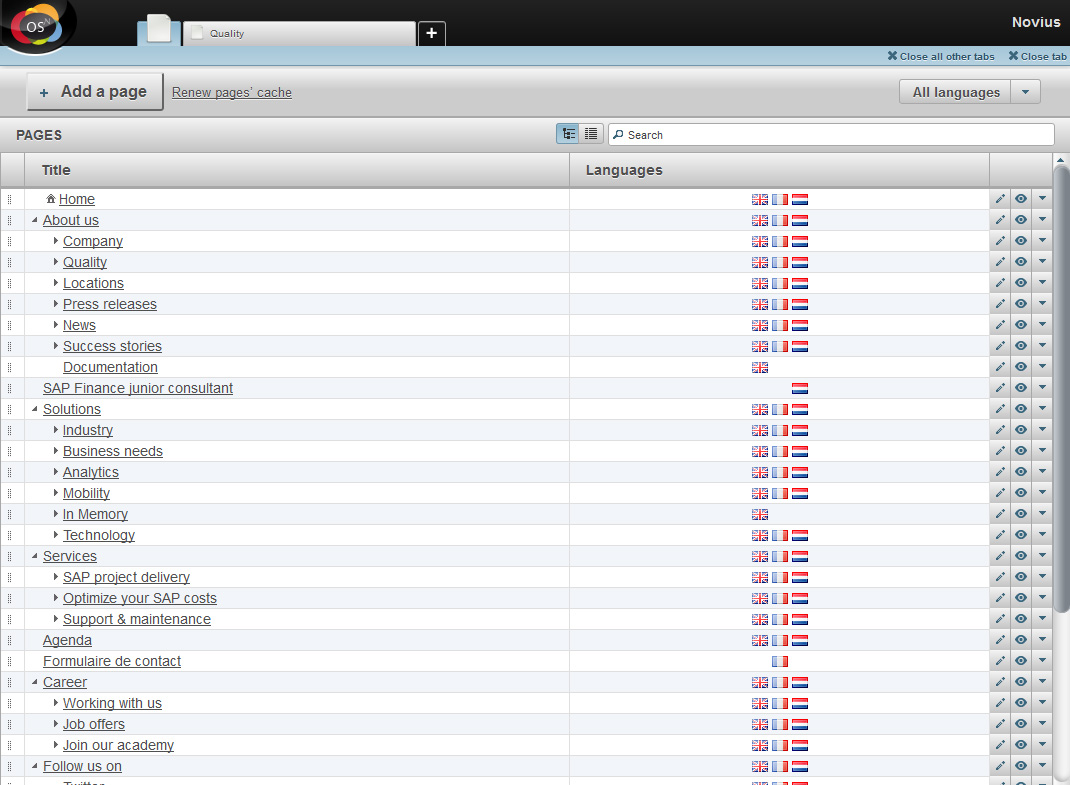
Application page of Novius OS

== See also ==
- List of content management systems

== Sources ==
- Screenshots: Novius OS
