= Bolt (content management system) =

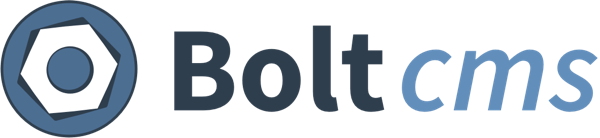

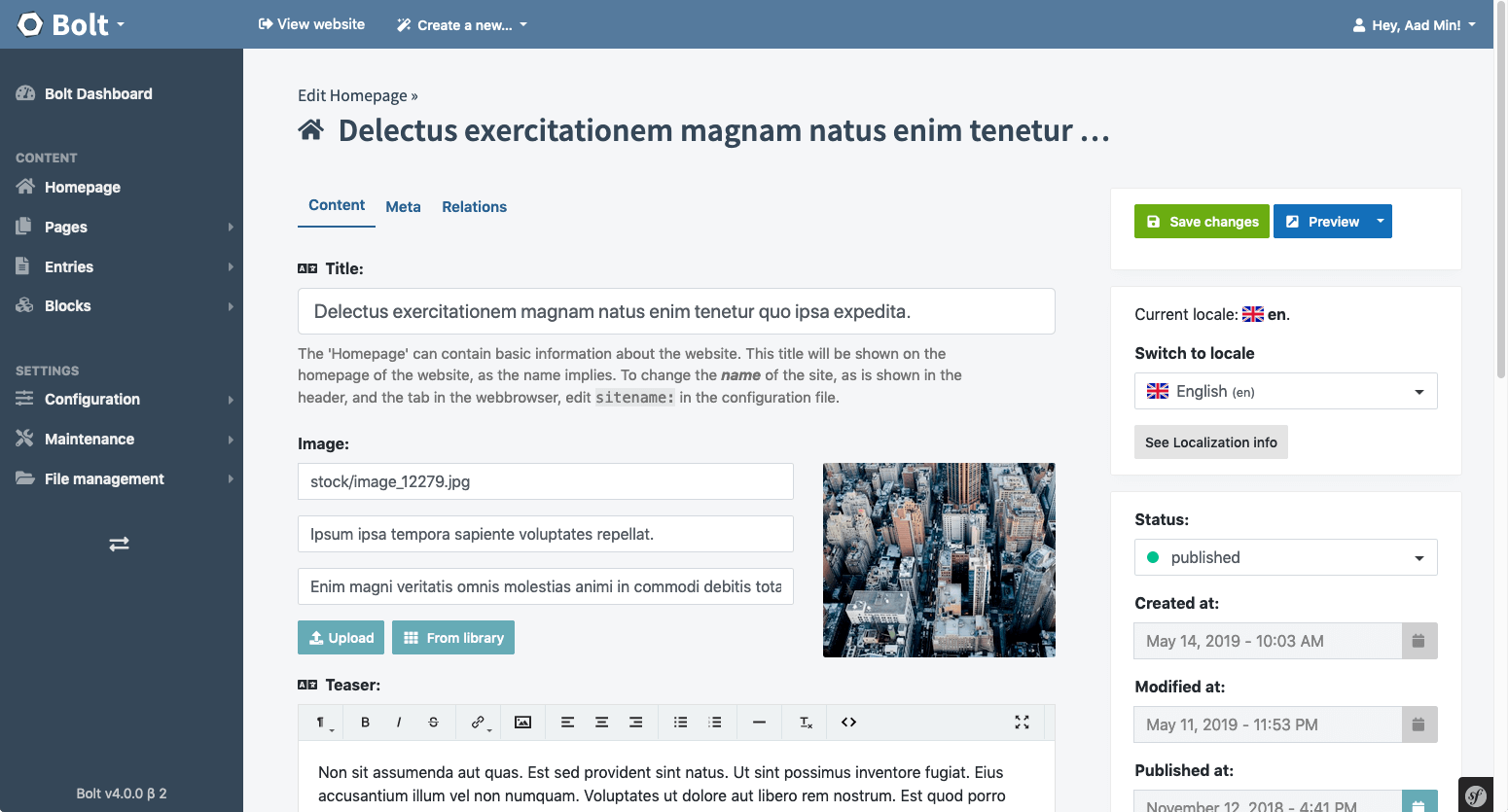
- A screenshot of Bolt CMS being used to edit a website's homepage
- Release: 2012
- Stable release: 6.1.4 / 2026-07-05[±]
- Written in: PHP
- Engine: Twig
- Type: Content management system
- License: MIT
- Website: boltcms.io
- Repository: github.com/bolt/core

Bolt is a free, open-source content management system based on PHP. It was released in 2012 and developed by Two Kings and the Bolt community. Bolt uses Twig for templates and includes features for content and user management. Bolt can be installed on any Apache or nginx web server with SQLite, MySQL or MariaDB and PHP 7.2.9 or later.

== See also ==
- Weblog software
- List of content management systems
