= Pixie (comics) =

Pixie, in comics, may refer to:

- Pixie (X-Men), a Marvel Comics character associated with the X-Men and their family of titles
- Pixie (Morlock), a member of the Marvel Comics group of mutants known as the Morlocks
- Pixie (Eternal), a Marvel Comics character most prominently featured in the series, Marvel: The Lost Generation
- Pixy, a graphic novel by the Swedish cartoonist, Max Andersson
- Wasp (character), was given the alias of "Pixie" in the alternate universe of Morgan Le Fay in Marvel Comics' Avengers vol. 3 #2-3

== See also ==
- Pixie (disambiguation)
