= B2evolution =

Web content management system

- Developer: François Planque
- Stable release: 7.2.5 / 2022-08-06[±]
- Written in: PHP
- Operating system: Cross-platform
- Type: Content & community management system blog software
- License: GNU General Public License version 2
- Website: www.b2evolution.net
- Repository: github.com/b2evolution/b2evolution

b2evolution is a content and community management system written in PHP and backed by a MySQL database. It is distributed as free software under the GNU General Public License.

b2evolution originally started as a multi-user multi-blog engine when François Planque forked b2evolution from version 0.6.1 of b2/cafelog in 2003. A more widely known fork of b2/cafelog is WordPress. b2evolution is available in web host control panels as a "one click install" web app.

Most of the early major releases were named after famous cities or particular places the project maintainer has visited and/or was inspired by.

After version 5.0, the project began to emphasize online community and online marketing features and integration with social networking sites, with the ability to automatically post new content to Twitter. To highlight the software's ability to manage many types of content, its blogs were renamed to "collections".

b2evolution 5.0 was rapidly adopted, becoming the most popular version, but overall b2evolution usage is declining relative to competitors WordPress and Drupal. Currently, it is installed on less than 0.1% of websites.

== Main features ==
Known primarily for its multi-blog capabilities, b2evolution also includes "all the features of traditional blog tools" like file & photo management, advanced skinning, multiple domain support, detailed user permissions, and W3C standards compliance. It installs on almost any LAMP (Linux, Apache, MySQL/MariaDB, PHP) server. The software will run on IIS using FastCGI, but database servers other than MySQL and MariaDB are not supported. Configuration is handled through the installer or administrative back-end.

In addition to its ability to manage multiple blogs, b2evolution supports multiple users and admins under a single installation without the need of external plugins. b2evolution also supports numerous third-party plugins. These include text format extensions enabling Textile, Auto-P, Greymatter, BB code, Texturize, LaTeX, and graphic smilies. Also, plugins which facilitate full integration with third party tools such as Gallery 2, YouTube, and digg are available.

Other features include community-wide spam filters, in which many b2evolution sites aggregate and tag spammer IPs into a central blacklist for the benefit of all b2evolution blogs, a button to declare "comment spam bankruptcy"—which deletes all comments across an entire b2evolution installation, a fully skinnable interface, strong SEO features including automatic redirection of renamed articles and insertion of canonical link tags, url shortening, localization into a dozen language packs, and a fully exposed API for plugin developers to add new functionality. b2evolution's code is factored into the blog application itself and a framework called EvoCore. EvoCore can be used on its own to build non-blog web applications.

== See also ==
- List of content management systems
- Blog software
