= Dotclear =

Open-source blog publishing application

- Original author(s): Olivier Meunier
- Initial release: 2002
- Stable release: 2.34 / 2024-05-17[±]
- Repository: codeberg.org/Dotclear/dotclear
- Written in: PHP
- Operating system: Cross-platform
- Type: Blog software
- License: GNU General Public License version 2
- Website: dotclear.org

Dotclear is an open-source blog publishing application distributed under the GNU GPLv2. Developed originally by Olivier Meunier from 2002, Dotclear has now attracted a solid team of developers. It is relatively popular in French speaking countries, where it is used by several major blogging platforms (Gandi Blogs, Marine nationale, etc.).

Dotclear's proposed aim is to develop a software that fully respects web standards based on open source services, with multilingual interface and publishing capabilities. It is written in PHP.

Notable features include handling many blogs, using Wiki or XHTML syntax for entries, adding pages that are independent from the flow of entries and support for several database types: (MySQL, MariaDB, PostgreSQL, SQLite).

== See also ==
- List of content management systems
- Blog software
