= Cloud CMS =

- Developers: Gitana Software, Inc.
- Release: August 2010
- Stable release: Cloud CMS Public Cloud v3.2.94 / October 28, 2026
- Written in: Java, JavaScript, Node.js
- Operating system: Cross-platform
- Type: ECM
- License: Commercial License for the Cloud, Apache 2.0 open source drivers, libraries and developer tools
- Website: gitana.io

Cloud CMS is an enterprise content management system offered under both a SaaS and an On-Premises model using Docker containers. It was designed from the ground up to leverage a fully elastic architecture built on top of Amazon AWS, Elastic Search, and MongoDB in order to provide a "Headless" CMS.

== History ==
Michael Uzquiano founded Cloud CMS in 2010. The goal was to design and build a product that was data-oriented, elastic and low-cost. By utilizing Amazon's native and scalable services as well as emerging NoSQL databases like MongoDB, the Cloud CMS product emerged and found an early niche within digital agencies.

One outcome of this work was the development of AlpacaJS, an HTML5 forms engine for web and mobile applications that uses JSON Schema and Handlebars templates to generate user interfaces in a presentation-agnostic way. Cloud CMS releases AlpacaJS under the Apache License 2.0, and it is used in:

- Fox
- Pearson
- Sony
- Virgin Mobile

== Usage ==
Enterprise content management for documents, web, mobile, images and application delivery.

== See also ==
- List of content management systems
- List of collaborative software
- Document collaboration
- Document-centric collaboration
