= PHP-Fusion =

Content management system

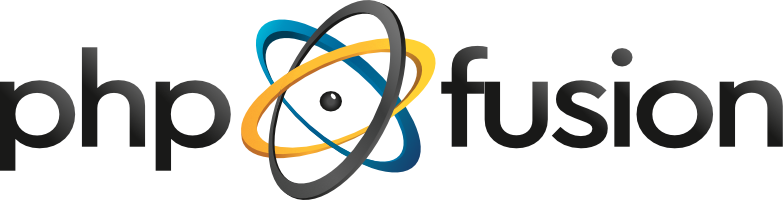
- Developer: PHP-Fusion Inc
- Initial release: April 12, 2003; 22 years ago
- Stable release: 9.10.30 / 2022-09-01[±]
- Written in: PHP, JavaScript
- Operating system: Unix-like, Windows, Linux
- Available in: 19 languages
- Type: Blog software, Content Management System, Content Management Framework, user management software, social networking software
- License: AGPL v3
- Website: php-fusion.co.uk
- Repository: github.com/PHPFusion/PHPFusion

PHP-Fusion is a free and open-source web framework based on PHP and MySQL & MariaDB that has an integrated content management system (CMS) among many other features.

To function, PHP-Fusion has to be installed on a web server, this can be either locally hosted or remotely hosted.

PHP-Fusion was one of the five winner finalists at the Open Source CMS Awards in 2007.

== See also ==
- Weblog software
- List of content management systems
