= Orchard Project =

Orchard

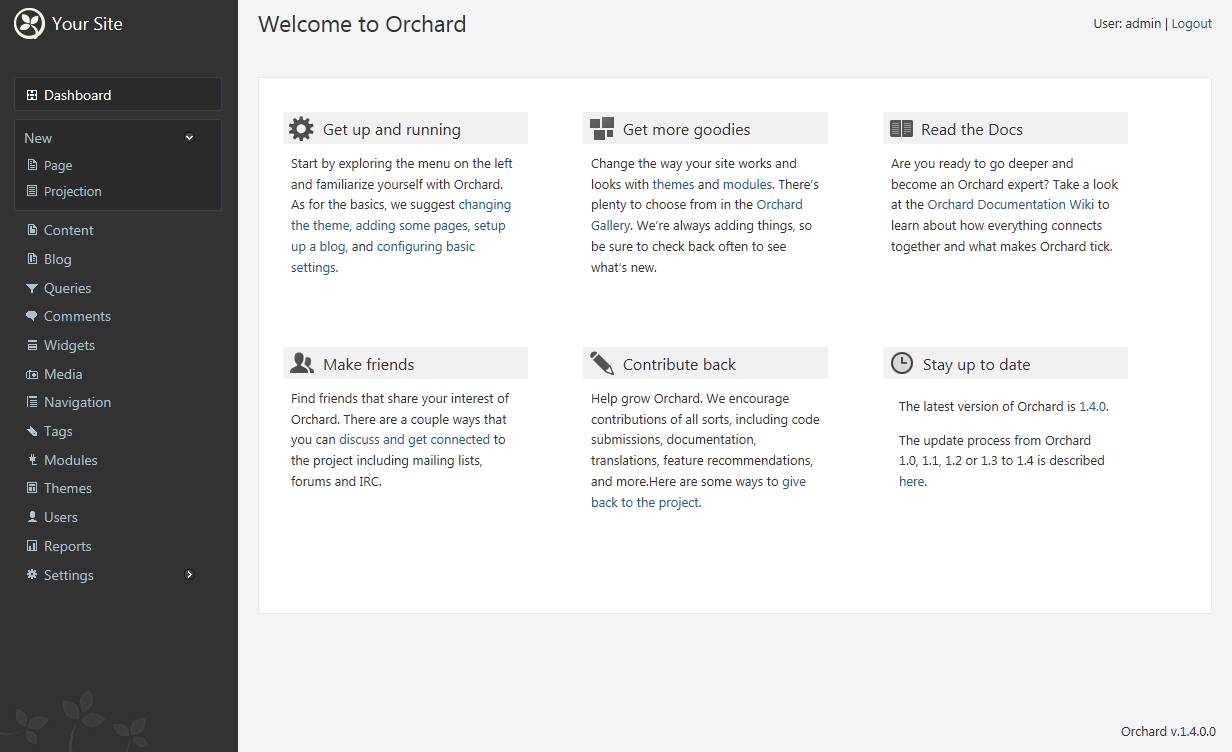
- Orchard 1.4 Dashboard
- Developer: .NET Foundation
- Release: January 2011; 15 years ago
- Stable release: 1.11.0 / 2026-01-13[±]
- Written in: ASP.NET
- Operating system: Microsoft Windows
- Type: Content management framework, Content management system, Community and Blog software
- License: New BSD License
- Website: orchardcore.net/orchardcms
- Repository: github.com/OrchardCMS/Orchard

Orchard is an open source, free content management system developed using ASP.NET MVC platform. The original Orchard project, also known as Orchard 1, is based on the .NET Framework and have been developed starting in 2009.

The next generation of the project is called Orchard Core and is based on ASP.NET Core. It is divided into two related projects, Orchard Core Framework which is a multi-tenant and modular ASP application framework and Orchard Core Platform which is a library of reusable packages.Orchard Core CMS, which is a web content management system implemented with the framework, is a part of NET Core.Orchard Core is not a direct port of the original Orchard CMS, but a re-development of it.

Orchard is delivered as part of the ASP.NET Open Source Gallery under the .NET Foundation. It is licensed under a New BSD license, which is approved by the Open Source Initiative (OSI). The predecessor of Orchard was Microsoft Oxite.

The Orchard Core project is supported by the .NET Foundation and is licensed under the BSD 3 Clause License.

== Project status ==
The project includes an extensibility model for both modules and themes, a dynamic content type system, ease of customization, localization and more.

Although several of primary developers work for Microsoft, it is no longer an officially developed Microsoft product, and is under the auspices of the .NET Foundation.
