= PhpWebLog =

phpWebLog
- Original author(s): Jason Hines
- Final release: 0.5.3 / October 31, 2001
- Written in: PHP
- Operating system: Cross-platform
- Type: Content management system
- License: GNU General Public License
- Website: sourceforge.net/projects/phpweblog/

phpWebLog is a blog and content management system written in PHP. Some of its features include moderated story submissions, integrated content management system, multiple themes and language support, user-friendly administration interface, story importing / exporting, expandable links manager, threaded comments system, and more.

== History ==
phpWebLog was originally started in 1998 as a way to serve dynamic content for a small music review site called "The Friends of Incentive". phpWeblog was one of the first open-source blogging systems and was the basis for a few forks, the more prominent being Geeklog and KorWebLog. phpWebLog was released under the GPL software license.

== References and external links ==
- phpWebLog project home on SourceForge
- phpWebLog project home on FreshMeat
- Review of phpWeblog on Linux Magazine
