= Ametys CMS =

- Developer: Ametys
- Stable release: 4.8.4 / 2024-02-13[±]
- Written in: Java
- Operating system: Cross-platform
- Type: Content management system, content management framework
- License: Apache License 2.0
- Website: www.ametys.org

Ametys is a free and open source content management system (CMS) written in Java. It is based on JSR-170 for content storage, Open Social for gadget rendering and a XML oriented framework. It is primarily designed to run large corporate websites, blogs, intranets and extranets on the same server.

Ametys is Java based and runs on any computing platform capable of running the Java Runtime Environment and an application server.

== History ==
Ametys is a professional open-source CMS (content management system) written in Java.

Ametys was created in 2003 by passionate Web and Java experts. Since 2005 Ametys has been deployed in higher education, for which specific components for uPortal and Jasig projects were developed. In 2009, it was ported to the level of a professional open source CMS by Anyware Services (headquarters in France).

Ametys evolved through the collaboration of the community of developers, users and integrators.

The downloadable version includes user authentication via LDAP and CAS, and a WYSIWYG editor administration.

Ametys 3.4 was released in August 2012 and saw several improvements and new functionality including new plugins as UGC, glossary, FAQ, and blog management. It also included new practices of Social web.

== Modules ==
Ametys comes with many features :

- Multi-site and multilingual platform
- Front-end editing
- RSS feed support
- Document library manager, Alfresco and other document library integration
- LDAP Integration
- Website Tools : comments feed, Share buttons, Twitter feed integration, OpenSocial gadgets
- Blogs and wikis
- Newsletter management
- Web Form management
- Online survey management
- Maps
