= CMS Made Simple =

Content management system

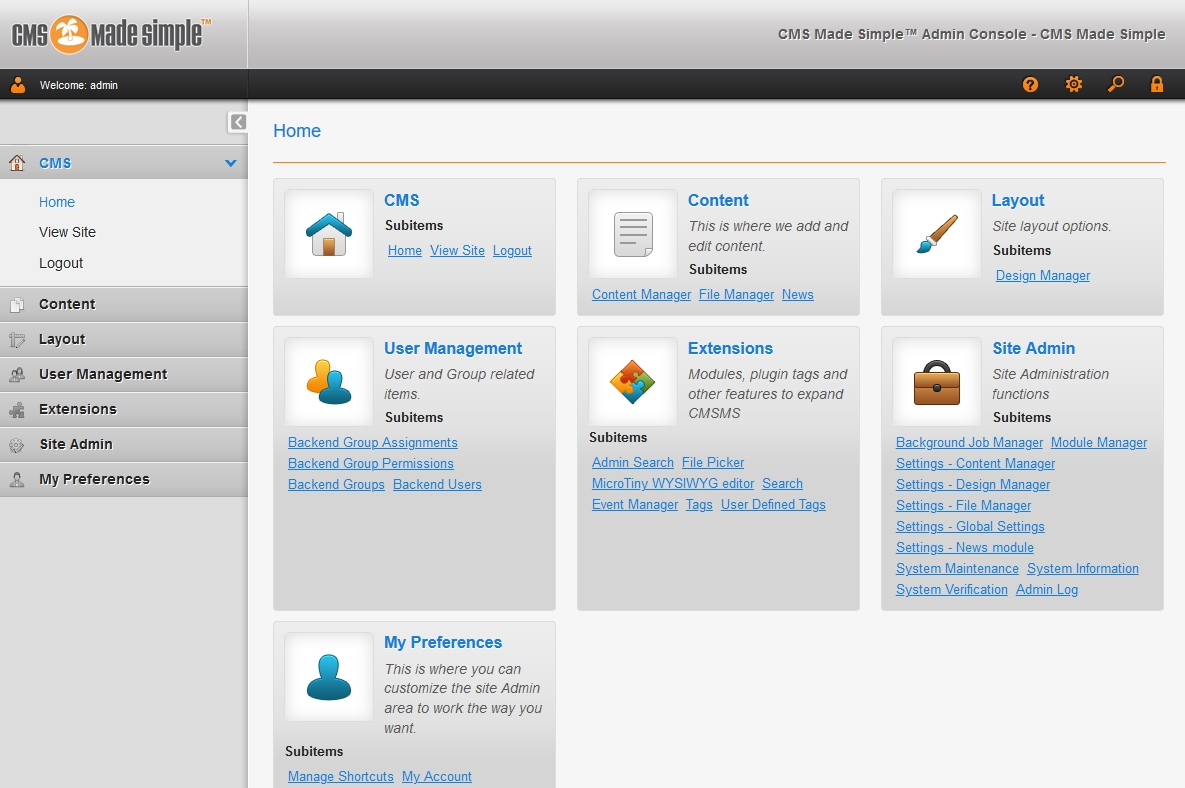
- CMS Made Simple Admin Interface
- Stable release: 2.2.23 / 13 August 2026; 37 days ago
- Written in: PHP
- Operating system: Platform-independent
- Type: Content management system
- License: GNU General Public License
- Website: cmsmadesimple.org

CMS Made Simple (CMSMS) is a free and open-source content management system (CMS) for small to medium-sized websites. It is written in PHP, uses MySQL as its database, and uses the Smarty template engine for layout. It is released under the GNU General Public License.

== Features ==
CMS Made Simple is designed as a modular base package. Common use cases (news, blogs, calendars, guestbooks, galleries, and similar) are usually added through modules rather than being forced into every install.

Notable characteristics include:

- Layout and content are separated through Smarty templates and stylesheets
- Role-based permissions (admin, designer, and editor roles can be extended)
- Configurable pretty URLs for individual pages
- Caching mechanisms for performance
- Content, templates, and stylesheets stored in the database (aside from basic configuration)
- Integrity checksum tools for installed files
- Localization through language files, with administration available in many languages
- Event manager hooks that modules and custom code can use (for example, to reindex search content after edits)
- Extensions via modules under /modules, plugins/tags under /plugins, and user-defined tags managed in the admin UI

=== Requirements ===
Current 2.2.x releases target modern PHP and MySQL environments. According to the project's release documentation, version 2.2.22 raised the PHP requirement to PHP 8.1 or later (with compatibility through PHP 8.3), and version 2.2.23 extended compatibility to PHP 8.5.

Typical hosting requirements include a PHP-capable web server (Apache, Nginx, IIS, or similar), MySQL, PHP tokenizer support, and an image library such as GD or ImageMagick.

=== Bundled modules and themes ===
Default installations include core modules such as News, Search, FileManager, ModuleManager, MenuManager, MicroTiny (a streamlined TinyMCE-based WYSIWYG editor), and related supporting components. Themes can be created in the admin interface or imported/exported; additional themes are available from the project's theme repository.

Popular third-party extensions available through the Forge include galleries, form builders, calendars, frontend user systems, catalogs, newsletters, and guestbooks.

== Community ==
CMS Made Simple has an official support forum, documentation site, and developer Forge. Regional communities have also formed outside the main English site, including German- and French-language support forums.

The project has held annual community meetings known as GeekMoot, combining developer discussion with user-facing sessions.

== History ==
Development was started on 1 July 2004 by Ted Kulp after he looked for a suitable CMS for the Music Player Daemon website. From about version 0.8, releases used South Pacific island code names in addition to version numbers. Version 1.0 was released on 10 September 2006.

For the 2.x line, the project switched to a country/city naming scheme: the first release of a branch is named after a country, and later releases use city names in that country.

== Versions ==
The table below summarizes major branches in the style used on the German Wikipedia article, with every official 2.2.x release after 2020 listed individually from the project documentation.

Branch	Version	Release date	Notes
0.8	0.8.2	17 January 2005	Older release
0.9	0.9.2	25 February 2005	Older release
0.10	0.10.4	9 November 2005	Older release
0.11	0.11.2	21 December 2005	Older release
0.12	0.12.2	10 May 2006	Older release
0.13	0.13	18 May 2006	Older release
1.0	1.0.8	18 June 2007	Older release
1.1	1.1.4.1	7 October 2007	Older release
1.2	1.2.5	12 May 2008	Older release
1.3	1.3.1	24 June 2008	Older release
1.4	1.4.1	9 August 2008	Older release
1.5	1.5.4	6 April 2009	Older release
1.6	1.6.10	25 May 2011	Older release
1.7	1.7.1	1 May 2010	Older release
1.8	1.8.2	12 August 2010	Older release
1.9	1.9.4.3	27 August 2011	Older release
1.10	1.10.3	9 January 2012	Older release
1.11	1.11.13	20 February 2015	Older release
1.12	1.12.2	28 March 2016	Older release
2.2	2.2.7	10 March 2018	PHP 5.6+; older release
2.2	2.2.8	28 July 2018	PHP 7.2 support; older release
2.2	2.2.13	4 December 2019	Bug-fix and security release; older release
2.2	2.2.14	30 March 2020	Maintenance release (T'Sou-ke)
2.2	2.2.15	13 October 2020	Bug-fix and security release (Bonaventure)
2.2	2.2.16	21 January 2022	Truro; PHP 7.0+
2.2	2.2.17	13 June 2023	Iqualuit
2.2	2.2.18	7 August 2023	Apex
2.2	2.2.19	28 November 2023	Selkirk
2.2	2.2.20	8 April 2024	Saguenay
2.2	2.2.21	6 June 2024	Sherbrooke
2.2	2.2.22	12 August 2025	Saskatoon; PHP 8.1+ / 8.3 compatibility; currently supported
2.2	2.2.23	13 August 2026	Wunnumin; PHP 8.5 compatibility; current stable

Per the development team's support policy, the currently supported releases are the latest two versions of the active branch (as of August 2026: 2.2.22 and 2.2.23).

== Distributions ==
Official packages are commonly offered as English-only base installs and full language packs, with checksum files. Diff/upgrade packages are also published so existing sites can update within a branch; when an /install directory is present in the upgrade package, a database upgrade step is required after uploading files.

== Forks ==
Historical forks include CMSMS MLE (Multi Language Edition), which aimed at native multilingual support and was later separated from the main project, and PowerCMS, a German performance-oriented fork that was discontinued around 2008.

== Awards and reception ==
CMS Made Simple has appeared in Packt Publishing open-source CMS awards, including a first-place result in the 2010 Best PHP Open Source CMS category. It later won CMS Critic's Best Open Source CMS award in 2017, and earlier received CMS Critic recognition including a People's Choice Award in 2014.

Books and guides have been published for administrators and developers, including beginner titles and a Packt development cookbook.

== See also ==
- Content management system
- List of content management systems
