= Grav (software) =

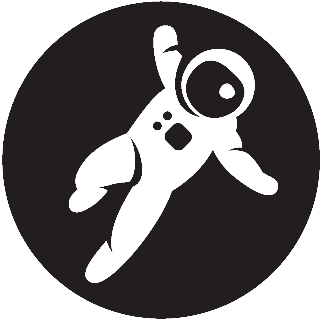
- Logo of the Grav CMS
- Developers: Andy Miller, Djamil Legato, Matias Griese
- Release: 30 July 2014; 12 years ago
- Stable release: 1.7.52 / 2026-04-29[±]
- Written in: PHP
- Operating system: Cross-platform
- Type: Content management system
- License: MIT License
- Website: getgrav.org
- Repository: github.com/getgrav/grav

Grav is a free, self-hosted content management system (CMS) software written in the PHP programming language and based on the Symfony web application framework. It uses a flat file database for both backend and frontend.

Grav is designed to have a shallow learning curve, and to be easy to set up. The focus of Grav is speed and simplicity, rather than an abundance of built-in features that come at the expense of added complexity.

The name Grav is a shortened version of the word gravity.

Grav is the most starred PHP CMS on GitHub, with over 14,565 stars.

== Awards ==
- CMS Critic Awards – Best Open Source CMS 2016
- CMS Critic Awards – Best Flat File CMS 2017
- CMS Critic Awards – Best Flat File CMS 2019
- CMS Critic Awards – Best Flat File CMS 2020
- CMS Critic Awards – Best Flat File CMS 2021

== See also ==
- Content management system
- List of content management systems
