= Nucleus CMS =

- Developer(s): The Nucleus Group
- Final release: 3.70 / September 22, 2014
- Repository: github.com/NucleusCMS/NucleusCMS
- Platform: PHP
- Type: Blog, Content Management System
- Licence: GNU General Public License
- Website: nucleuscms.org

Nucleus CMS is an open-source blog management software package written in PHP, with a MySQL backend. It is used to manage frequently-updated Web content. With a little tweaking (mainly to skins), it might be considered a lightweight content management system.

Nucleus makes use of a callback function which has led to a plugin system in multiple languages. The general drive within the development community is that functionality should exist as plugins as totally as possible. This philosophy has led to a relatively light and uncluttered base install.

== History ==
v1.0 was released in 2002. After that, managing multiple blogs from one system became possible.

On June 14, 2014 its developers announced that the project would officially sunset.

On January 27, 2016 it was announced that development would continue again.

== See also ==
- List of content management systems
