= OU Campus =

Omni CMS (formerly OU Campus) is a web content management system (CMS) for colleges, universities, and other higher education institutions.

Omni CMS (then known as OU Campus) was launched in 1999 using the cloud computing, software as a service (SaaS) product delivery model. It was developed by OmniUpdate, a privately owned company headquartered in Camarillo, CA. OmniUpdate was started by software developers Tom Nalevanko, Lance Merker, and Yves Lempereur (developer of BinHex 4.0). OmniUpdate and Destiny Solutions merged to form ModernCampus in March 2021.

== Technology ==
The product uses a push technology. Omni CMS can be accessed via the cloud – also known as software as a service (SaaS). The underlying platform of Omni CMS is developed in Java, and uses XSLT 3.0 for template transformation. Omni CMS uses open standards, including XML, HTML, and CSS and is extensible through APIs. As a decoupled system, Omni CMS works with any server-side technology (e.g., PHP, ASP, .NET, ColdFusion) and for templates uses XHTML/HTML5 and CSS, as well as XML/XSLT. The templates are customizable so that developers can create sites using popular web development techniques including Responsive web design to adapt to all screen sizes and devices. Omni CMS does not store page content in a database; rather, each page is stored as an XML file on the CMS server. It is compatible with Internet Explorer, Firefox, Google Chrome, and Safari. Omni CMS' push technology architecture requires a separate database for some applications that use interactive content such as forms and surveys. These applications can be handled through the Live Delivery Platform (LDP), which provides a server-side module for plug-in application architecture. LDP is accessed and managed through Omni CMS.

== Features ==
- Custom WYSIWYG toolbars
- Source code editing
- Instant publishing (no queues)
- Multi-channel output (e.g., HTML, XML, PDF, text, mobile)
- Content repurposing—Omni CMS allows users to repurpose content through Assets. Changes made to an asset are automatically changed on every page where that asset resides.
- Accessibility check
- Analytics
- Multi-browser preview
- Asset management
- Facebook and Twitter integration
- Global find and replace
- Updates made to web pages can be simultaneously made to mobile pages
- Omni CMS separates content from design, so users can style their content without breaking the page layout and design
