= ContentBox Modular CMS =

Content management system

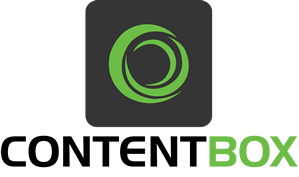
- Developers: Ortus Solutions, Corp
- Release: February 8, 2012
- Stable release: 6.0.0 / 2023-12-20[±]
- Written in: CFML, Java
- Operating system: Any
- Type: Content management software
- License: Apache License v2
- Website: www.ortussolutions.com/products/contentbox
- Repository: github.com/ortus-solutions/contentbox

ContentBox Modular CMS is an open-source content management system for CFML, created by Ortus Solutions, Corp. ContentBox has been designed as a modular HMVC software based on Hibernate ORM and the ColdBox Platform.

ContentBox Modular CMS is dual-licensed as Apache v2 or a commercial license.

== Features ==
- Modular architecture.
- Content store modeled after the Java Content Repository (JCR)
- Hibernate ORM object oriented model.
- Multiple caching layers.
- Permission based security system.
- Login tracker with auto-banning capabilities.
- WYSIWYG page editing.
- Customisable templates and layouts.
- Programmable API for creating Modules
- Built-in user tracking & email marketing.
- Multi-language i18n support.
- Audit trails, versioning and rollback.
- Content scheduling and workflows.
- Buil-in URL firewall

== Compatibility ==
ContentBox Modular CMS is a CFML-powered web application, and runs on any modern CFML engine, including Adobe ColdFusion 9 and above, Lucee 4.5 and above, Railo 2 and above.

ContentBox Modular CMS is also delivered as a WAR file on any standard Java servlet container, such as Apache Tomcat.

== Hosting ==
- Viviotech
- Hostek
