= CMSimple =

- Developer: Peter Harteg, now Gert Ebersbach
- Release: 15 April 2003
- Stable release: 5.15 / 2024-03-25; 24 months ago
- Operating system: Cross-platform
- Type: Content Management System
- License: GPLv3
- Website: www.cmsimple.org/en/

CMSimple_XH
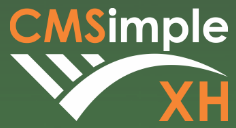
- Developer: Active Community
- Stable release: 1.7.5 / October 4, 2021
- Operating system: Cross-platform
- Type: Content Management System
- License: GPLv3
- Website: www.cmsimple-xh.org

CMSimple Classic & LXH
- Developer: Preben Bjorn Biermann Madsen / Peter Harteg
- Stable release: 0.3 / February 4, 2015
- Operating system: Cross-platform
- Type: Content Management System
- License: GPL
- Website: CMSimple Classic & LXH at SourceForge

CMSimple is a free content management system. It aims to be simple, small and fast. As it is written in PHP it runs on Linux/Apache servers, or on Win32 with Apache or IIS. CMSimple is licensed under the terms of the GPL3.

CMSimple does not need a database as it writes page data directly to an HTML file on the web server. This simplifies installation and backups, and also makes CMSimple a low-cost option on web hosts which charge extra for database access. Configuration files and language files are also saved in a PHP file. Like many Content Management Systems, CMSimple offers a wide variety of plug-ins, including many made by third parties.

== Structure ==
The look and feel of a CMSimple website is stored in a template file using HTML and CSS. This can be designed by the installer or selected from over 500 free templates available through CMSimple. Third-party designers can be commissioned to provide a unique template. All error messages and text strings are contained in a plain text file. These are available in many languages, and can be translated by the installer to match the user's dialect or language. If support is needed, the installer can make necessary changes on the user's low-spec machine or remotely.

A basic site, using a default template, can be uploaded to the server, configured and populated with pre-existing text within 20 minutes. Template customization takes more time, and requires knowledge of HTML and CSS. Several hundred templates are available at no cost.

== Licensing ==
On 31 December 2009, CMSimple was released under the GPL. Previously, commercial licences were sold. When a visible link to CMSimple was kept on the website, then CMSimple was free to use, and the AGPL licence applied; when the link was removed a licence needed to be purchased. A community of users provide support through a forum and wiki. About 2500 licences were purchased as of December 2008.

== Support ==
It is supported by a web forum and the former AGPL version by an archived web forum, with over 1000 participants. English is the principal language of communication but there are CMSimple communities in Denmark, Germany, France, Spain and Brazil. A book has been published in Danish, Byg et website, Britt Malka, ISBN 87-7843-711-3, and another one in Dutch CMSimple voor beginners, Emile Bastings, ISBN 978-90-815802-1-2.

== Forks ==
There are several CMSimple forks. Best-known are 'CMSimple_XH' and CMSimple '4.X.X'. In 2009, 'CMSimple_XH 1.0' was released. In 2011, 'CMSimple_XH 1.5' was released. In 2012, based on the 'CMSimple_XH 1.5.3' code, Gert Ebersbach releases his beta version of Fork 'CMSimpleCoAuthors', which is later renamed 'CMSimpleSubsites'.

After Peter Harteg stopped developing the original 'CMSimple' in 2012, Gert Ebersbach bought the rights to the brand and renamed CMSimpleSubsites to 'CMSimple 4.0'.

Three CMSimple forks are now available:

- 'CMSimple Classic' version 3.54, compatible with backward compatibility and supported by Preben Bjorn Biermann Madsen.
- 'CMSimple 5.x.x' from Gert Ebersbach
- 'CMSimple_XH 1.x.x' from independent community.
