= Gallery Project =

- Developer: Bharat Mediratta, Brad Dutton
- Stable release: 3.1.5 / November 14, 2021
- Operating system: Cross Platform
- Platform: PHP
- License: GPL
- Website: gallery.menalto.com
- Repository: galleryrevival.com

Gallery or Menalto Gallery is an open-source project enabling management and publication of digital photographs and other media through a PHP-enabled web server. Photo manipulation includes automatic thumbnails, resizing, rotation, and flipping, among other things. Albums can be organized hierarchically and individually controlled by administrators or privileged users.

== History ==
Gallery 3 is the current release of Gallery. It is a complete rewrite of Gallery 2 intended to be small, intuitive, fast, and easily customizable. Gallery 3.0 was released on October 5, 2010. Gallery 3.0.9 was released on June 28, 2013. Since 2017, Gallery 3 development has continued on GitHub. Support was transferred to the Gallery 3 Users Forum. On November 14, 2021, Gallery 3 version 3.1.5 was released to include support for PHP 8.

Gallery 2 was publicly released on September 13, 2005. Gallery 2.3.1 included support for PHP 5.3 and was released on December 17, 2009. Development of Gallery 2 ceased in 2012.

Gallery 1 was released in April 2001 and was developed for seven years, the last release being version 1.5.10 on November 21, 2008.

Gallery participated in the Google Summer of Code in 2006, 2007, and 2008. Gallery also participated in OpenUsability's Season of Usability in 2008 and 2009.

In 2003, Gallery was SourceForge's October Project of the Month.

== Requirements ==
Gallery 3 Requires:

- Apache version 2.2 or greater
- MySQL 5.0 or greater
- PHP 5.4 or greater

== Controversy ==
In 2010, Gallery announced the use of some proprietary Adobe tools to build some components of Gallery 3 in Adobe Flash. Several users expressed great concern that proprietary software was being used in an open-source project and that Flash components were being included in an open-source package. A rebuttal to the controversy included a disclosure that Adobe Flash objects had previously been used for file uploading functionality in Gallery only seemed to further ignite the controversy. In 2019 Gallery 3.1.0 was released which replaced the Flash-based uploader with modern open source code.

== Revival ==
In June 2013 the developers of Gallery 3 released version 3.0.9 code-named "Chartres" and in June 2014 announced that they would suspend further development of Gallery 3. The GPL license allowed for continued development by others or the creation of a fork of Gallery based on the existing code. In 2019 a group of long-time Gallery 3 users developed and released Gallery 3.1.1 to keep the program viable on servers running PHP 7 and 8 which also included additional technical and feature improvements. Version 3.1.5 of Gallery 3 was released on November 14, 2021.
