= Microweber =

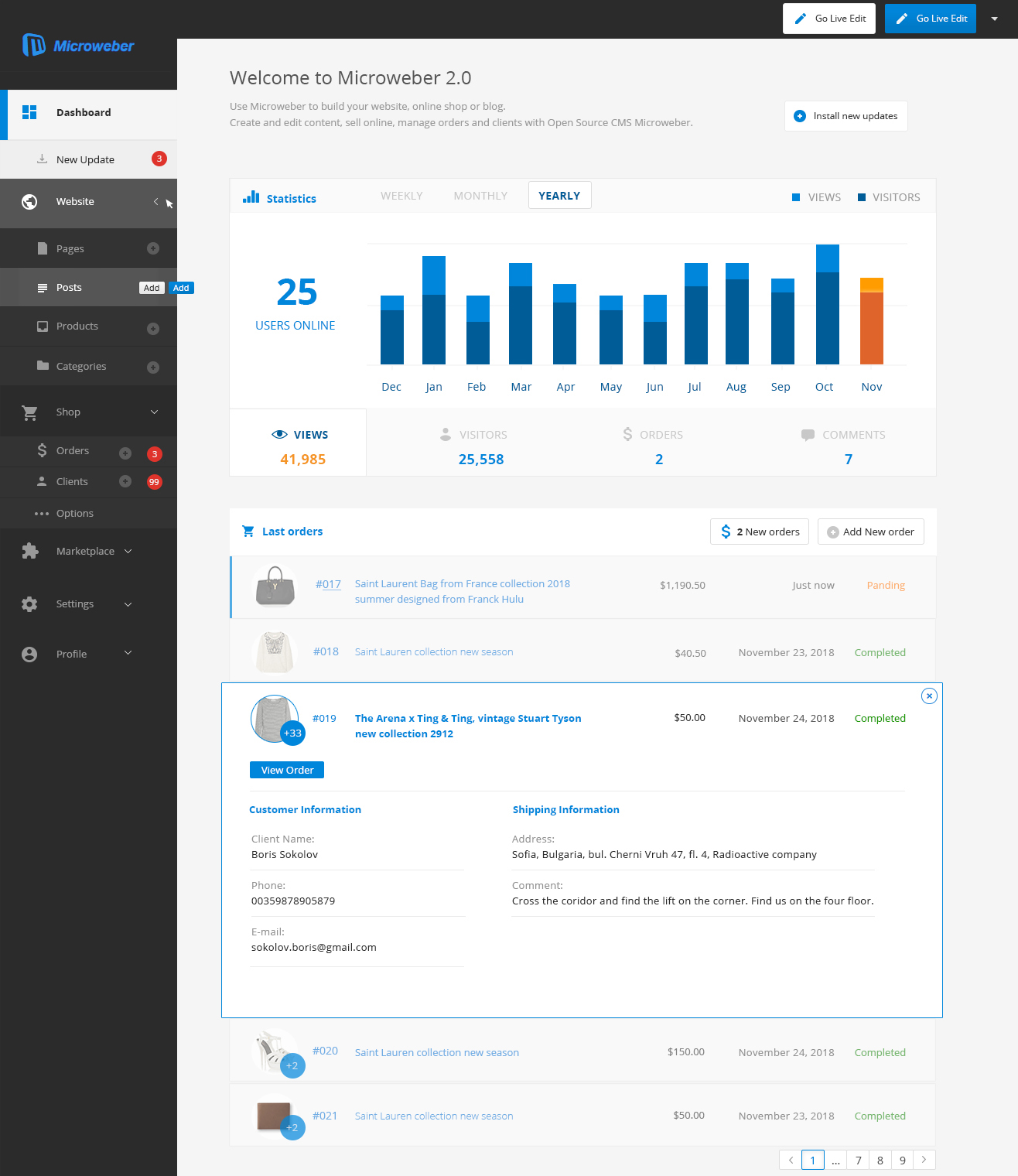
- Drag & Drop Website Builder
- Written in: PHP
- Type: Content management system
- License: MIT License
- Website: www.microweber.com
- Repository: github.com/microweber/microweber

Microweber is an open-source content management system and website builder. It is based on the PHP programming language and the Laravel 5 web application framework, using drag and drop and allowing users to quickly create content, while scheduling and managing multiple displays. It has a Live Edit feature enabling users to view their edits as they would appear. The application has been used by several professional organisations according to rankings on OpenSourceCMS.com and Softaculous. Developers can freely access the code, exchanging their knowledge and contributions with the rest of the open-source community.

The site was launched in a beta version in April 2015 in Sofia, Bulgaria as a grass-roots project for an easy-to-use CMS system. The business has ranked as one of Bulgaria's Top 10 startups.
