= Phire CMS =

- Developer: Nick Sagona
- Initial release: November 1, 2010
- Stable release: 2.1.0 / July 9, 2016
- Written in: PHP
- Operating system: Cross-platform
- Type: Content management system
- License: New BSD License
- Website: www.phirecms.org

Phire CMS (pronounced "fire") is an open source content management system and publishing platform for managing the content of websites and web applications. Phire CMS is licensed under the new BSD license, is written using the MySQL database and the PHP programming language.

== History ==
The Phire CMS project started in 2009 by developer Nick Sagona and was born out of a collection of custom-built content management systems that had been developed by Nick to meet specific client needs. The project started under the code name Phoenix, but was changed to Phire before the official release. Phire is heavily influenced by what has become a standard set of expected features available in other CMS projects, but offers a handful of additional features built directly into the application, such as multiple site management and mobile access and presentation.

It's something you've seen over the past few years with the publishing platforms out there, like the ones we've used the most, would be obviously, WordPress, Expression Engine and a little bit of MODx. You look at them, and obviously, they get you there and what not. But a lot of times, one would do "A", "B" and "C" pretty well, another one would do "D", "E", and "F" pretty well, and this one over here would do "A", "D" and "F" well – and it was these buckets of features that you would sit and figure out which CMS or publishing platform would fit your client's particular needs at that time. I felt like a lot of those features could be more tightly integrated under a single system. In some cases, I started building these little custom CMS's for clients that handled some things, and clients kept saying they really liked it and it was really easy and simple to use, and that's how I started down the road to building Phire.

The core of the Phire CMS version 1 branch is specifically built on top of the object-oriented PHP library, Moc10 PHP Library, and uses the JavaScript library, Jax JavaScript Library, to enhance the overall user interface and user experience.

=== Releases ===
Official coding and development of Phire began in the beginning of January 2010. Beta-testing occurred between August 2010 and October 2010, and the official release of the stable version 1.0 was released on November 1, 2010. An update to Phire, v1.0.1, was released on November 22, 2010, addressing security and adding a few small upgrades. Phire CMS v1.1 was released on January 9, 2011, and contains a host of new features and updates, including an easier installation process and support for 12 languages.

Although the name "Phire" has no direct connection, the naming convention for the project code names is influenced by the Marvel Universe, particularly the X-Men set of characters. The project code names do not always have to relate to some element of fire or flame. The "Ph" in Phire itself is more of a play on the "PH" of PHP, the programming language in which the project is written.

Version	Code name	Release date	Notes
0.9	Phoenix	August 1, 2010	Beta stage release of the CMS, released as Phoenix
1.0.0		November 1, 2010	First official release of Phire CMS
1.0.1		November 22, 2010	First update of Phire CMS to address security vulnerabilities plus a small number of UI upgrades
1.1.0	Pyro	January 9, 2011	Update of Phire CMS to add a number of new features, such as an easier installation process, language support, nested sections and more blog-like features
1.1.1		May 18, 2011	Update of Phire CMS to add a small set of new features, plus some security enhancements
1.1.2		July 7, 2011	Update of Phire CMS to add and improve features regarding archive, blogging and recent content listing and management

=== Future release ===
Development for Phire CMS v 2.0 was announced on April 4, 2012, and is currently underway. It will utilize the next generation of the PHP framework that it was built on, the Pop PHP Framework, moving on from the Moc10 PHP Library, which is now at its end of life. While the new version will most likely break backward compatibility and require PHP 5.3 or greater, a good many robust features will be built in and improved upon as directed from community input and feedback.

== Features ==
Phire CMS has many features that are built in, but it also provides a platform for the application to be extended via its API. Phire also takes a more aggressive stance on its support of PHP, as it requires PHP 5.2.6 or above and is fully compatible with PHP 5.3. Phire does not support PHP 4. It also requires MySQL 5.0 or above.

- Installs on Linux, Unix, Windows or Mac OS based servers
- Uses Apache, Microsoft IIS or any web server platform that supports URL rewrites
- Language support for 12 languages
- Multiple site management is built-in; system administrators can assign different users to different sites.
- Multiple user access levels
- Open authoring—system administrators can allow or disallow users to work on others' content.
- SEO-friendly URLs and meta-content management
- Site content syndication feed
- Mobile system access and alternate mobile presentation for content is built-in
- Built-in support for popular WYSIWYG editors
- Robust file and image settings, including image sizing and batch image uploads
- Extensive site member control, including registration, login and member session management
- Spam filter and CAPTCHA built-in for site input interactions
- Page caching for performance
- Built-in sections to group and order content and assets together for display as needed; sections can be nested as well.
- Built-in external feed integration
- Integration and support for the popular video engine sites (YouTube, Vimeo and Viddler)
- Support for extensions—themes to quickly apply different designs and plugins to extend the application's overall functionality.

== Vulnerabilities ==
A handful of security issues were discovered in the first official release of Phire CMS. According to Secunia, Phire CMS v1.0 had 25 scripts with a maximum rating of "Less Critical" in the areas of cross-site scripting and manipulation of data. A total of 36 scripts were patched for security for the Phire CMS v1.0.1 release.
