= Alchemy CMS =

- Developers: Thomas von Deyen, Robin Böning, Martin Meyerhoff
- Release: June 2010
- Stable release: 7.4.8 / 2025-08-15[±]
- Written in: Ruby
- Platform: Ruby on Rails
- Available in: Deutsch, English, Español, Français, Italiano, Nederlands, Русский
- Type: Content management system
- License: BSD License
- Website: alchemy-cms.com
- Repository: github.com/AlchemyCMS/alchemy_cms

Alchemy CMS, or just Alchemy, is a free and open-source content management system written on top of the Ruby on Rails web application framework. It is released under the BSD license and the code is available on GitHub. It comes as a mountable engine and is packaged as a Ruby gem.

== History ==
In 2007, the project started as a closed-source program and was called 'washAPP'. In June 2010 the software was open sourced under the name Alchemy CMS by Thomas von Deyen. Since Alchemy CMS is a Ruby Gem it gets released on the rubygems.org platform.

== Features ==
- Templating system
- Multilingual websites
- Multisite management
- User access control
- Fulltext search engine
- Contact forms
- Downloadable attachments
- Image processing
- Extendable Through Rails engines
- Template caching
- Admin interface for resource controllers
