= Pixie (name) =

Pixie is a feminine given name of English origin. Notable people with the name include:

- Pixie Davies (born 2006), English actress
- Pixie Fletcher (1930/1931–1961), New Zealand hurdler
- Pixie Geldof (born 1990), English model and singer
- Pixie Jenkins (born 1957), Australian musician
- Pixie Lott (born 1991), English singer-songwriter
- Pixie McKenna (born 1971), Irish physician and TV presenter
- Pixie O'Harris (1903–1991), Australian artist
- Pixie Smith or Pamela Colman Smith (1878–1951), English artist and illustrator
- Pixie Williams (1928–2013), New Zealand singer
