= Backdrop CMS =

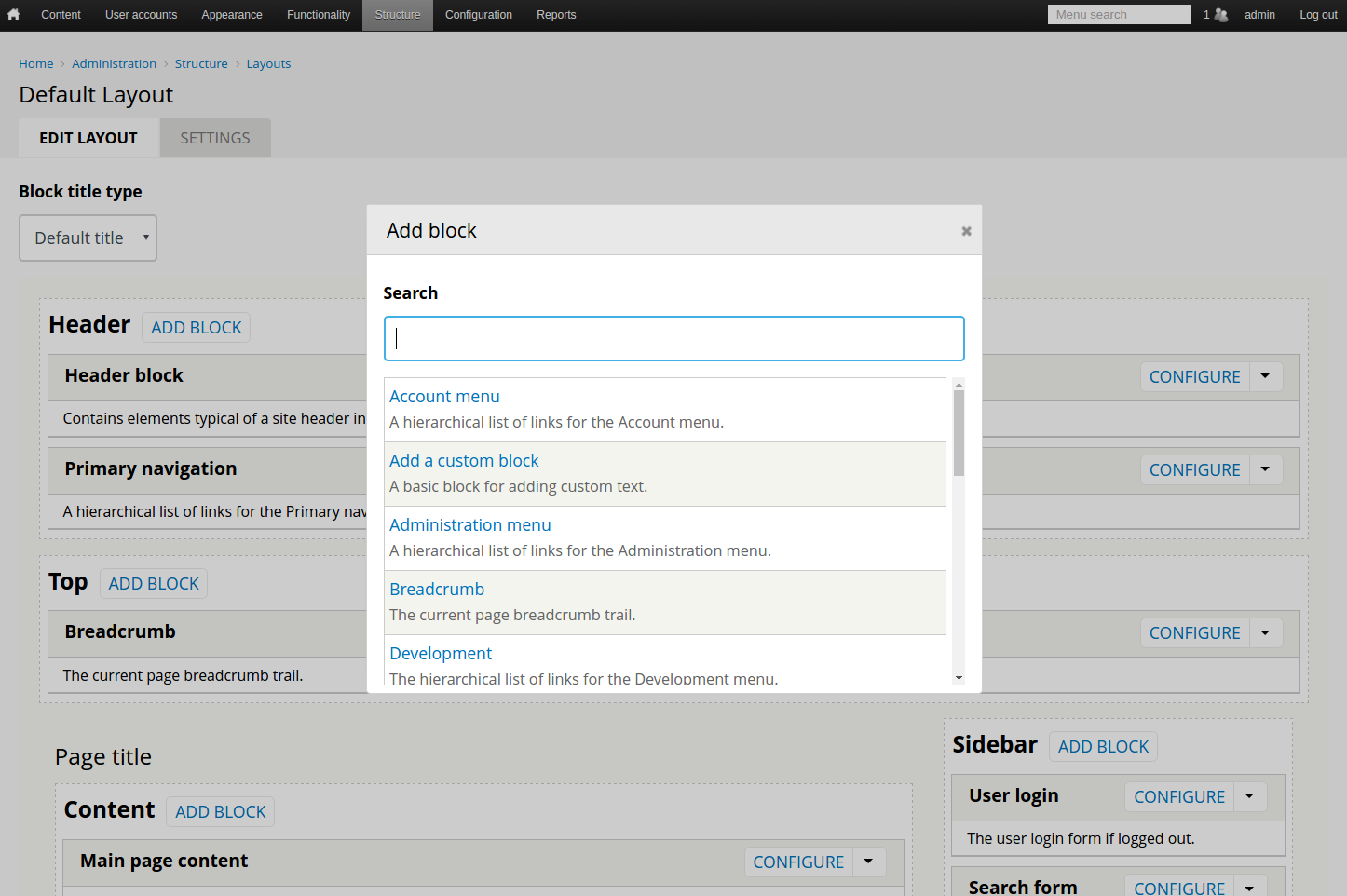
- Screenshot Backdrop CMS Layout Admin.
- Developer: Backdrop community
- Release: January 15, 2015; 11 years ago
- Stable release: 1.34.2 / 2026-06-10[±]
- Written in: PHP
- Operating system: Unix-like, Windows
- Platform: Cross-platform
- Size: 38.6MB (uncompressed Backdrop CMS core)
- Available in: Multilingual
- Type: Content management framework, Content management system, Community and Blog software
- License: GPLv2 or later
- Website: backdropcms.org
- Repository: github.com/backdrop/backdrop

Backdrop CMS is an Open source, community-developed, content management system, written in PHP, and licensed under the GNU General Public License. Backdrop CMS was forked from the Drupal CMS in 2013 by two Drupal developers, Nate Lampton (né Haug) and Jen Lampton. Backdrop is very similar to version 7 of the Drupal CMS, maintaining most of the same functionality and features. The project's mission is to "enable people to build highly customized websites affordably, through collaboration and open source software".

== History ==
The Backdrop CMS project was forked about 2 years into the Drupal 8 development cycle. Backdrop therefore retained some features newly included in Drupal version 8, but excluded Symfony, and most of the many new dependencies that were added to Drupal 8. Backdrop's founders and early contributors had concerns over the significant (and at the time controversial) changes coming to Drupal, and expressed concern that maintainers of existing Drupal websites would be unable (or unwilling) to manage these changes, and the cost that comes with them.

== Dependencies ==
Installation of Backdrop requires a web server running PHP 7.1.0 or higher and a MySQL 5.5.0 database or higher (or equivalent, like MariaDB). All Backdrop versions are being tested on PHP version 7, and PHP version 8. Backdrop core, and the majority of contributed modules are developed on the GitHub platform.

== Development Support ==
Docker-based local development environments like DDEV and Lando support Backdrop CMS out of the box by providing Backdrop CMS as an installation option. Backdrop is also available as an installation option on the managed hosting platform, Pantheon.

There are upgrade paths available to developers who wish to upgrade Drupal 6 and Drupal 7 sites to Backdrop. Core modules have upgrade paths as do some of the more popular contributed modules. Some may require extra work to upgrade smoothly.

== Organization of the Backdrop project ==
Backdrop is a community-developed project, guided by a Project Management Committee (PMC), which is modeled on the respective Apache project PMC. The project is maintained by volunteer developers on the GitHub platform, with shared code contributions reviewed and approved by community members. As of November 26, 2020, there were 136 contributors to the core Backdrop project on GitHub, and 92 contributors maintaining 717 user-contributed modules, themes, and layouts The Backdrop community hosts weekly development, design, and outreach webcasts with recordings available on YouTube.

Backdrop CMS is a member of the Software Freedom Conservancy. This membership allows Backdrop CMS to operate as a charitable initiative without having to manage their own corporate structure, administrative services, or legal team.

== Integrations ==
CiviCRM, the open source CRM focused on non-profits, officially supports Backdrop, in addition to Wordpress and Drupal. The Webform CiviCRM module was also ported from Drupal to Backdrop and can be used for more complex integrations between CiviCRM and Backdrop.

== See also ==
- Comparison of web frameworks
- List of content management systems
- Drupal
