= Concrete CMS =

Free software content management system written in PHP

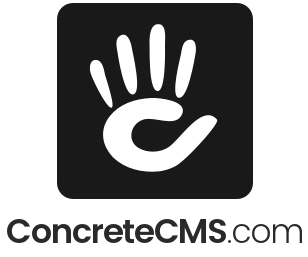
Concrete CMS Concrete CMS
- Other names: concrete5
- Initial release: 30 September 2008; 17 years ago
- Stable release: 9.4.2 / 1 July 2025; 4 months ago
- Repository: https://github.com/concretecms/concretecms
- Written in: PHP
- Operating system: Cross-platform
- Type: Content management system
- License: MIT
- Website: www.concretecms.com

Concrete CMS (formerly concrete5) is an open-source content management system (CMS) for publishing content on the World Wide Web and intranets.

Concrete CMS is designed for ease of use, for users with a minimum of technical skills. It enables users to edit site content directly from the page. It provides version management for every page, similar to wiki software, another type of web site development software. Concrete CMS allows users to edit images through an embedded editor on the page. As of 2021, there are over 62,000 live websites that are built with Concrete CMS.

== Code ==
Concrete CMS code is based on model–view–controller architecture and object-oriented programming. Some core features are: integrated server caching, developer API, version tracking system and search engine optimization.

== Features ==
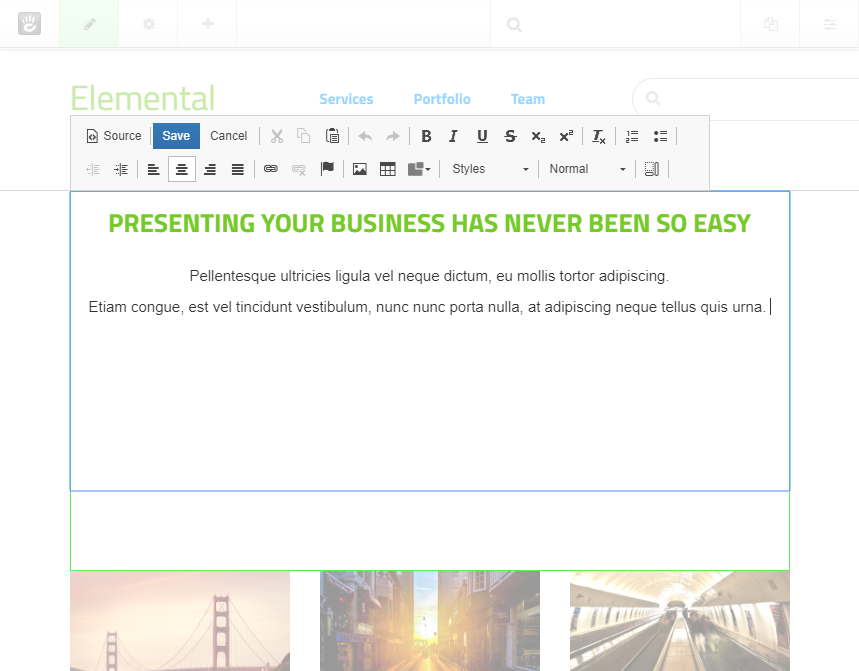
The Concrete inline content editing GUI

Concrete CMS features in-context editing (the ability to edit website content directly on the page, rather than in an administrative interface or using web editor software). Editable areas are defined in Concrete templates which allow editors to insert blocks of content. These can contain simple content (text and images) or have more complex functionality, for example image slideshows, comments systems, lists of files, and maps. Other addons can be installed from the Concrete Marketplace to extend the range of blocks available for insertion. Websites running Concrete can be connected to the Concrete repository, allowing automatic upgrading of the core software and of any addons downloaded or purchased from the Marketplace.

== Licensing ==
Concrete CMS is free and open-source (FOSS) under the MIT software license.

== History ==
Development of Concrete CMS began in 2003 as a rapid-design approach to building the now-defunct LewisAndClark200.org, the official site for the Ad Council's National Council for the Lewis & Clark Bicentennial.

The version 7 release of concrete was incompatible with prior versions. All prior versions became known as the legacy branch, with the final version being 5.6.4.0 before reaching end of life status on 24 August 2019. Modern Concrete (version 7 and above) features a new user interface, a user-accessible data model called Express, an extensive permissions model, and in-context WYSIWYG editing.

Version 9 was released in October 2021. This major new release added new features like multisite support, boards, new built-in gallery block and a new UI based on Bootstrap 5.

Regular updates and security patches have been released.

== Awards and recognition ==
- SourceForge's "Project of the Month" October 2008.
- As of Nov. 3, 2021, Concrete CMS was listed as the 15th most popular on the Entire Internet in Open Source with 60,236 live websites and 55,855 domains redirecting to those sites.

== Community ==
Concrete CMS has a large community of users and developers who contribute to the project. As of Aug 2023 there is more than +258 contributors.

=== Users ===
Notable Concrete users

- United States Army
- United States Army's Family and MWR Programs
- U.S. Army World Class Athlete Program
- Flathead County, Montana
- Milwaukee Mitchell International Airport
- Potawatomi Hotel & Casino
- Mid Michigan Community College

== See also ==
- List of content management systems
