= Sellerdeck =

Sellerdeck Ltd, formerly Actinic, is a British ecommerce platform founded in 1996. In 2000 it floated on the London Stock Exchange, raising £21 million.

Sellerdeck offers a desktop based eCommerce platform which runs on a PC desktop and Perl as well as other services such as Digital Marketing and SEO improvements. It provides an implementation service to new customers on the WooCommerce platform as well as providing a migration service to that platform.

Sellerdeck became part of the ClearCourse group in December 2022.
