= MojoPortal =

Content management system

mojoPortal
- Developer(s): i7MEDIA
- Initial release: 2004
- Stable release: 2.9.0.1 / 2023-07-24[±]
- Repository: github.com/i7media/mojoportal
- Written in: C#
- Operating system: Windows
- Platform: ASP.NET
- Type: Content management systems
- License: EPL
- Website: http://www.mojoportal.com/

mojoPortal is an open source, cross-platform, content management system (CMS) for ASP.NET which is written in the C# programming language. mojoCMS supports plugins and has built-in support for, among others, forums, blogs, event calendars, photo galleries, and an e-commerce feature. The project was awarded an Open Source Content Management System Award by Packt in 2007 saying that the "ease of use, set of relevant tools and plugins and also the fact that it is cross platform, made it stand out above the rest". In February 2017, i7MEDIA, LLC, acquired the project from lead developer Joe Audette.

== Awards ==
- eCommerce Developers Perth
- 3rd place in the 2009 CMS Awards by Packt Publishing, in the Non-PHP category

== Key features ==
- Works with MS SQL Server, SqlAzure, MySQL, PostgreSQL, and SQLite databases
- Supports multiple sites on one installation and database
- HTML 5 compliant Content Management with support for work flow and approval/publishing process
- Custom Skinning with support for user selectable skins and individual skins per page
- Supports TinyMCE, CKeditor, or XStandard HTML WYSIWYG
- Easily Customizable User Profile System
- Member List
- Flexible Menu system
- Localizable, currently translated into 10 languages
- Passwords encryption
- SSL support for the whole website or per page
- URL re-writing
- Error logging and optional debug logging
- Authenticate against the database, LDAP, Active Directory, Windows NTLM, or OpenID.
- Content Workflow
- Content Versioning
- Content Template System
- Content Style Template System
- Content Widgets
- Built in SEO (Search Engine Optimization)
- 301 Redirect Manager
- Integrated Google Analytics

== Default modules ==
- HTML Content
- Blog
- SuperFlexi
- Event Calendar
- Forums
- Contact Form
- Survey
- Poll
