= Pixie (content management system) =

- Developer: Scott Evans / toggle
- Release: May 2008
- Final release: 1.0.4 / March 21, 2010
- Written in: PHP
- Operating system: Cross-platform
- Size: 1.9 MB (archived)
- Type: Content management system
- License: GNU General Public License
- Website: www.getpixie.co.uk

Pixie was an open source web application content management system that allowed the creation and management of small websites.

Pixie's code is written in the server side script language PHP and uses a MySQL database for data storage. Pixie is free of charge and released under the GNU General Public License.

== History ==
Written by Scott Evans, Pixie CMS was first released in May 2008 as part of the May 1st Reboot.

Version 1.04 was released on March 21, 2010, with a new WYSIWYG editor, more available languages and the latest version of jQuery. Version 1.04 is the largest upgrade to date.

On November 11, 2009 Pixie was awarded the runner up prize in the Packt Publishing Open Source Content Management System Awards, in the category of Most Promising Open Source CMS.

In early January 2011, Pixie CMS and its website was sold to Lucid Crew of Austin Texas.

== Target market ==
The target market consists of:

- Individuals who want to create their own homepage.
- Clubs and groups.
- Small and medium-sized companies.
- Organizations and Schools.

== See also ==
- List of content management systems
