= Comparison of web frameworks =

Two comparisons of web frameworks are available:

- Comparison of JavaScript-based web frameworks (front-end)
- Comparison of server-side web frameworks (back-end)
