= DotCMS =

Open source content management system

dotCMS

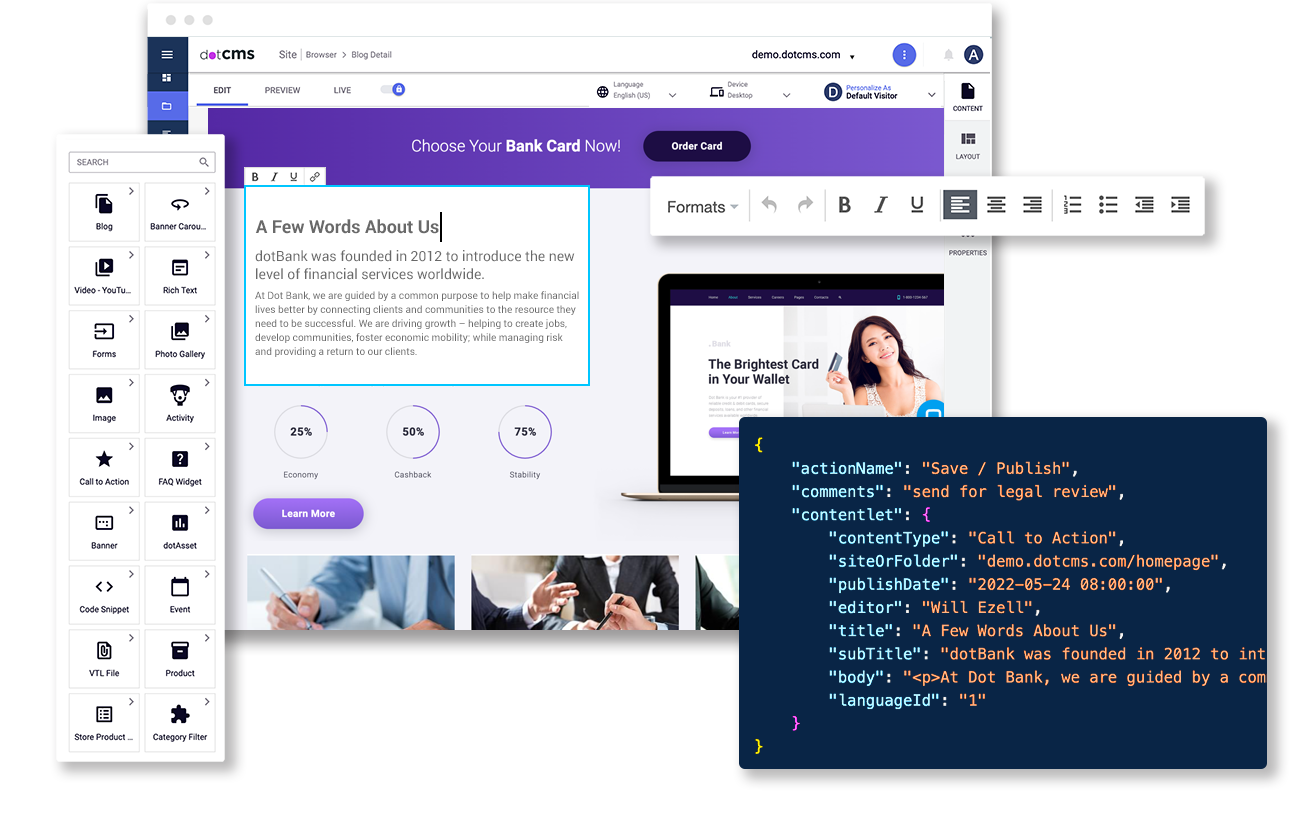
- Drag-and-drop content palette and visual editor in dotCMS
- Developer: dotCMS LLC
- Initial release: 1 January 2009; 17 years ago
- Stable release: 23.10.24 / 2024-03-04[±]
- Repository: github.com/dotCMS/dotCMS
- Written in: Java, JavaScript, TypeScript
- Operating system: Unix-like, Windows
- Platform: Cross-platform
- Available in: Multilingual
- Type: Content management system
- License: GPLv3 or later
- Website: www.dotcms.com

dotCMS is a content management system (CMS) written in Java for creating, managing, and delivering content and content-driven sites, applications, and intranets.

== Architecture ==
- Java based
- API Based Content Store
- Headless CMS (API First CMS)
- Offers Business Source License (BSL)
- Elasticsearch for all Content and Documents - external as of 5.3.0
- Cloud or On Premises
- RESTful Content Searching and Access
- Remote & Static Publishing
- SOC 2 (Type II) and ISO 27001 Certified

== Source Code ==
- Source Code available on GitHub

== dotCMS Products ==
dotCMS provides a Business Source License (BSL) of their content management system that is free to download and use. They also provide an Enterprise edition, which is a SaaS-based product, that you can purchase on an annual or monthly subscription.

== dotCMS Key Features ==
- Headless Content Management
- Visual Page Building
- Multi-tenant & Multi-site Management
- Workflows & Approvals
- Multilingual & Localization
- A/B Testing & Experiments
- Personalization
- Content Analytics
- dotAI (Artificial Intelligence)
- dotEvergreen (automatic updates to the current version)

== License ==
- dotCMS is dual licensed under the GNU General Public License v3 or as a Commercial license
