= Geeklog =

PHP open source software

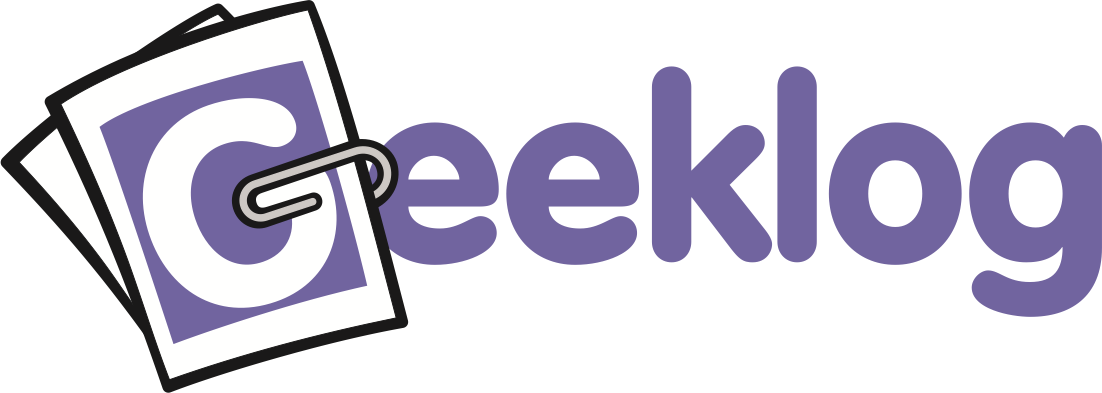
- Original author: Jason Whittenburg
- Developer: Dirk Haun
- Stable release: 2.2.2 / September 27, 2022; 3 years ago[±]
- Operating system: Cross-platform
- Platform: PHP
- Type: Content Management System
- License: GNU General Public License version 2
- Website: www.geeklog.net
- Repository: github.com/Geeklog-Core/geeklog

Geeklog is open-source software that works as a Weblog, CMS or Web Portal." It is written in PHP and during its history has supported MySQL/MariaDB, PostgreSQL, or Microsoft SQL Server as a database backend.

== History ==
Geeklog has historically focused on "performance, privacy, and security." In March 2010, the Geeklog project slogan was changed to "The secure CMS." in an effort to more accurately reflect the differentiating features compared to other content management systems. Other Geeklog features include "comments, polls, calendar, web links, content syndication, and more." Geeklog supports the Trackback and Pingback standards as well as content syndication by way of the automatic publication of RSS Feeds. Geeklog (in a manner similar to Movable Type and pMachine) allows one to "set fine-grained permission levels for each individual user." Geeklog is also "easily extensible via a modules API."

Many web hosting companies "automatically install open source blogging applications like Geeklog" "as part of their basic Web site packages." As such, it is "one of the more popular choices for a Web-based Content Management System along with WordPress and Drupal." Geeklog is available to many webmasters since it is included with the commercial web hosting software installers Fantastico, Softaculous, and Installatron that are bundled with many web hosting plans, although installations of Geeklog via these third-party installers may have support issues.

Geeklog was used by Groklaw, which was active between 2003 and 2020.
