= List of enterprise portal vendors =

This is a list of notable vendors of enterprise portals. An enterprise portal is a framework for integrating information, people and processes across organizational boundaries.

Vendor	Product Name	Technology	License	Portlet API
Apache Software Foundation	Jetspeed 2.3.1	Java EE	Apache License v2.0	JSR-286
ATG	ATG Portal	Java EE	Proprietary	JSR-168
Broadvision	Broadvision Portal 8.2	Java EE	Proprietary	JSR-168
Bluenog	Bluenog ICE 4.5	Java EE	Proprietary	JSR-168
Edge Technologies	enPortal	Java EE	Proprietary	Proprietary and Java API
Elcom Technology	CommunityManager.NET	.NET	Proprietary	unknown
JBoss and eXo	GateIn Portal 3	Java EE	LGPL	JSR-286
Bloomreach	Hippo CMS	Java EE	Open Source and Proprietary Licenses	Widgets / WOA
HCL Technologies (formerly IBM)	WebSphere Portal 9.5	Java EE	Proprietary	JSR-168, JSR-286, WSRP, Widgets / WOA, CMS
Interwoven	TeamPortal	Java EE	Proprietary	JSR-168
JBoss	JBoss Enterprise Portal Platform 5.1	Java EE	LGPL	JSR-286, WSRP
Larsen & Toubro Infotech	IntraNet	ASP.NET	Proprietary	unknown
Liferay	Liferay Portal 7.2	Java EE	LGPL and Proprietary Licenses	JSR-168, JSR-286, WSRP
Magnolia International Ltd.	Magnolia CMS	Java EE	GPL and Proprietary Licenses	Components, Spring, CMIS, JSR-170, Web-Services, JSON, JAAS, REST, Open-Social
Mairie de Paris	Lutèce	Java EE	BSD	JSR-168
Microsoft	Office SharePoint Server 2010	ASP.NET	Proprietary	WSRP, Webparts (Proprietary)
Open Text Corporation	Vignette Portal 8.0	Java EE	Proprietary	JSR-286
Oracle	Oracle WebCenter Suite 12c	Java EE	Proprietary	JSR-168, JSR-286, WSRP
Oracle (BEA Systems)	Oracle WebLogic Portal 10g	Java EE	Proprietary	JSR-168, JSR-286
Oracle (BEA Systems)	Oracle WebCenter Interaction 10g	Java EE/ASP.NET	Proprietary	JSR-168
Oracle	Oracle IAS Portal 10g	Java EE	Proprietary	JSR-168
Oracle Cloud	WebCenter Portal Cloud	Java EE	Proprietary	JSR-168, JSR-286
Samsung SDS	ACUBE Portal 5.0	Java EE	Proprietary	JSR-168
SAP SE	SAP NetWeaver 7.5	Java EE	Proprietary	JSR-168
Sun Microsystems	Sun Java System Portal Server 7.2	Java EE	Open Source, licensing & support plans	JSR-286
Sun Microsystems	Sun GlassFish Web Space Server 10.0	Java EE	Open Source, licensing & support plans	JSR-286
Tibco Software	PortalBuilder 5.2	Java EE	Proprietary	JSR-168
TmaxSoft	ProPortal 4.0	Java EE	Proprietary	JSR-168
Jasig	uPortal	Java EE	Apache License v2.0	JSR-168, JSR-286
Vialect	Noodle	Java	Proprietary	Widgets
