= Intranet portal =

Gateway that unifies access to enterprise applications

An intranet portal is the gateway that unifies access to enterprise information and applications on an intranet. It is a tool that helps a company manage its data, applications, and information more easily through personalized views. Some portal solutions are able to integrate legacy applications, objects from other portals, and handle thousands of user requests. In a corporate enterprise environment, it is also known as an enterprise portal.

== Background ==
Intranet and Internet share many elements and use the same technologies, but they fundamentally differ in their purposes. Unlike the Internet, an intranet operates within a private network. Connectivity transpires within the process called address mapping. Here, Intranet addresses are converted to Internet addresses to provide the required transparency and vice versa.

Through an intranet portal, a private network is able to impose its own local rules of behavior because of the installation and maintenance of a mechanism such as a firewall and intranet portal solutions. Web browsers cannot connect to the server behind it and must contact the gateway machine and abide by the restrictions mandated by the gateway. Only users within an organization can access the network. Users can also access the Internet by abiding by a set of local rules. The scope of the network allows the intranet portal to perform faster with higher throughput than the Internet.

== History ==
Corporate intranets began gaining popularity during the 1990s. As intranets quickly grew more complex, the concept of an intranet portal was born. Today, intranet portals provide value-added capabilities such as managing workflows, increasing collaboration between work groups, and allowing content creators to self publish their information.

A typical example of a web platform used to build and host an intranet is Microsoft SharePoint, which is used by 46% of organizations. SharePoint provides features necessary for collaboration, integration, and customization. as an example in North Korea, instead of using the traditional network setup, there is a state-wide intranet.

== Main features ==
Integration
Ability to integrate with current tools or the possibility of adding new tools. You have your Outlook calendar and email integrated in the intranet.
Security
Enable user- or group-based security to secure documents and sites throughout the intranet portal.
Customization
Software that is flexible to allow for organization. Web Parts can be used to create custom modules that can make interaction with the site easier. Ability for users to customize tools and resources they use most often.
Collaboration
People are now able to collaborate their work with each other. Example would be multiple people working on one document.
Communication Channels
Allows corporations to promote corporate culture and present information in a more interactive way than before.
Automation
Things like workflows and templates can automate specific document creation. Alerts can be created to help learn of changes and new additions to the intranet.
Applications
Links to applications for associates to perform duties.
User Friendly
Application must be easy to use and understand due to a wide range of technical abilities.
Remote Access
Ability for users to access content away from the office.
Document Repository
Ability to store and retrieve document information while maintaining regular backups to prevent data loss.
Blog
Used as a method to provide more timely information to employees, customers, and business partners.
People Search
Search enterprise wide for employee information such as contact information, specialty areas, group membership, personal interest, etc.
Enterprise Search
— search enterprise content using enterprise search
Targeted Content
Business portal administrators can target content by business group area, e.g., HR, Marketing, Legal, Corporate Executives, etc.

== Advantages ==
Intranet portal helps employees make better and more informed decisions, which result from increased knowledge. It also helps reduce costs, saves time, increases collaboration, increases productivity and effectiveness.

Intranet portal can help employees find information more easily and perform their jobs better, though few portal designs are optimal just out-of-the-box. In fact, especially in smaller companies, designers can realize some features found in off-the-shelf portal software through simpler (do-it-yourself) means. Most intranets have become completely unwieldy and present a highly fragmented and confusing user experience, with no consistency and little navigational support. Portals aim to correct this problem by presenting a single gateway to all corporate information and services. One benefit of creating this consistent look and feel is users need less time to learn how to use the environment. They also more easily recognize where they are in the portal and where they can go—no small feat when navigating a large information space. By integrating services and presenting personalized snippets on the initial screen, intranet portals also reduce the need for users to browse far and wide to obtain needed information, thus making it easier for them to perform their jobs.

Intranet portal is a Web-based tool that allows users to create a customized site that dynamically pulls in Internet activities and desired content into a single page. By providing a contextual framework for information, portals can bring S&T (Science and Technology) and organizational "knowledge" to the desktop.

== Disadvantages ==
Intranet Portals can be a large business cost. The maintenance and management can be time-consuming and expensive. Not only is it a cost to keep the portal running but a cost when the system goes offline. Most intranets are established to put all an organization's resources into one place and having that offline can force operations to be put on hold.

Security issues can become an ongoing problem. Unauthorized access is a concern and can result in users gaining access to sensitive information. Denial of access can cause issues for users needing access for their work.

Having everything in one place is only good if it's organized. Information overload can make finding information very difficult - lowering productivity.

== Activities ==
Tools & Resources — Area for employees to link to or download necessary applications to perform work functions. Information also provided to find internal and external resources.

Associate Services — .

Business Operations — To give users access to important business policies and manuals.

Company Calendar — To give user access to important company event dates and times.

Access Point for Employees — Location for employees default main company webpage to obtain all information regarding the company.

Wiki — can be used in the business environment for knowledge management

Workflow Management — Establish work flows for common business tasks such as submitting expense reports, submitting corporate HR paperwork and document approval processes.

Bulletin Board — Manage corporate announcements.

Task Management — Create and update shared task lists throughout the corporation.

== Notable software tools ==
| Product Name | Vendor | Cost | Software license |
|---|---|---|---|
| Central Desktop | Central Desktop Inc. | Not free. | Proprietary |
| Confluence | Atlassian Pty Ltd. | Support From $49.00/month to $3,990.00/month | Proprietary |
| Huddle | Huddle | Not free. Pricing depends on package options and number of users. | Proprietary |
| Hyperoffice | HyperOffice | Not free.Various Price Models. | Proprietary |
| Lotus Domino | IBM | Not free. | Proprietary |
| Liferay | Liferay | Free under LGPL. Must pay for support. | LGPL |
| Microsoft SharePoint Foundation | Microsoft | Free | Proprietary, Open-API |
| Microsoft SharePoint Server | Microsoft | Not free. From $90/user or $3/mo | Proprietary, Open-API |
| MindQuarry | Mindquarry GmbH | Free.(open source) | Mozilla Public License |
| MindTouch | MindTouch | Not free. | Proprietary |
| Plone | Plone Foundation | Free Download. Free/Community and paid support. | GPL |
| OpenAtrium | DevelopmentSeed | Free Download. Free/Community and paid support. | GPL |
| TeamLab | Ascensio System | Online. Free Intranet Server Bundle. | GPL |
| uPortal | Apereo | Free. Free/Community and paid support. | Apache 2.0 |
| WebSphere | IBM | Not free. | Proprietary |
| Zoho | ZOHO Corporation | Free for individual. Prices depend on needs of team or group | Proprietary |
| Xwiki | Xwiki SAS, Xwiki-Community | Free Download. Free/Community and paid support. | LGPL |

== See also ==
- Web portal
