= Sun Java System Portal Server =

Component of Java Platform Enterprise Edition

The Sun Java System Portal Server is a component of the Sun Java Platform, Enterprise Edition, a software system that supports a wide range of enterprise computing needs.

Portal Server allows administrators and delegated administrators to build portal pages and to make them available to individuals throughout an enterprise according to user identities.

Portal Server's core framework supports the Java Specification Request (JSR) 168 and 286 Java Portlet specification standard and the Web Services for Remote Portlets (WSRP) 1.0 standard for portal content. Portlet developers can use the NetBeans IDE or open standard tools to build standards-based portlets. Developers can also use design tools such as Dreamweaver to design new themes and skins. Portal administrators can then leverage portlets, WSRP consumers, or additional portal tools for adding content to portal pages.

The latest version of Portal Server is 7.2. This version provides a framework and a set of software modules that offer the following:

- Security
- Mobility
- Community Features
- Enterprise Search
- Identity-based content delivery
- Collaboration
- Business system integration
- Secure Remote Access
- Desktop Design Tool
- Delegated Administration
- Enterprise Edition Installer
- GlassFish V2 / Application Server 9.1 Support
- SharePoint Integrated Services
- AES Support for Secure Remote Access
- CMS Portlet and CMS Framework
- JSR286 / Portlet Container 2.0 Support
- WSRP 1.0
- Google Gadgets Integration
- Workflow API
- JSF Portlet Bridge 1.2
- NetBeans and Eclipse application development tools

== OpenPortal ==
At JavaOne 2007, the Sun Java System Portal Server team announced the renaming of the portal open source community. It's now called the OpenPortal Community.

== Partnership with Liferay ==
At JavaOne 2008, Sun and Liferay announced a strategic partnership that combines efforts and technologies from both companies' communities to enhance and maintain web aggregation and presentation technologies that are utilized in existing and future products. Liferay Portal 5 and Sun's Project WebSynergy are the first version of the new product families that are a result of this initiative and derived from the same codebase.
