= Nuxeo =

Content management system

- Developer: Hyland
- Stable release: LTS 2025 / 31 March 2025; 10 months ago
- Written in: Java
- Operating system: Cross-platform
- Type: Content management systems
- License: Apache 2.0
- Website: https://www.hyland.com/solutions/products/nuxeo-platform
- Repository: github.com/nuxeo/nuxeo

Nuxeo is a highly scalable, cloud-native, enterprise open source content management system with rich multimedia support.

== Corporate history ==
Nuxeo was founded in the year 2000 by Stefane Fermigier. Eric Barroca became the CEO and Director of the management Board in December 2008. Sometime around 2005, Nuxeo went through a technology re-architecture and developed a base content management framework on the Java environment. The digital asset management product was officially launched in February 2010, although it went into public beta in December 2009, and since then it has found a wide base of interest both in Europe and North America. Nuxeo was acquired by Hyland Software in 2021.

== Hyland Nuxeo ==
Hyland Nuxeo is an open source Enterprise Content Management platform, written in Java. Data can be stored in both SQL & NoSQL databases.

The development of the Hyland Nuxeo platform is mostly done by Hyland employees with an open development model.

The source code, documentation, roadmap, issue tracker, testing, benchmarks are all public.

=== Applications ===
Typically, Nuxeo users build different types of information management for document management, case management, and digital asset management use cases. It uses schema-flexible metadata & content models that allows content to be repurposed to fulfill future use cases.

=== Architecture ===
Nuxeo platform is a set of server-side and client-side software artifacts and tools that allow users to build, operate and maintain customized content management applications. The platform is composed of several layers:

- Nuxeo Runtime: The underlying component model that is used to declare, configure, test and activate services
- Nuxeo Core: The document repository providing schema management, CRUD, indexing & query. Implementation can rely on SQL or NoSQL depending on the use cases.
- Nuxeo Services: A set of document-related services that can be added on top of Nuxeo Core
  - Workflows, annotations, conversions, renditions...
- Client Libs: Client-side libraries encapsulating the server REST API
  - Java, JavaScript, Python, C#, PHP...
- Client SDKs: UI components and pre-built UI for various platforms
  - Nuxeo Elements for Web Components and WebUI
  - Nuxeo Mobile for mobile devices
  - Nuxeo Drive for filesystem synchronization

The Nuxeo platform is based on a configurable and extendable component model.

Using an open source development model, Nuxeo provides a subscription program with software maintenance, technical support, and customization tools. Nuxeo platform can be deployed on-premises or in the cloud.

=== Performance ===
Nuxeo Benchmarks are available.

== Product history ==
2006:

- CPS becomes Nuxeo Platform:
  - full rebuild from Python/Zope to Java/JEE
  - Use of Apache JackRabbit as the main storage backend

2008:

- Eric Barroca became the CEO and Director of the Management Board
- Series A Funding: $2.6 million from OTC Asset Management
- Native SQL Storage and REST API
  - clean and scalable SQL backend with Visual Content Store
  - introduces WebEngine (JAX-RS + Freemarker)

2009:

- Distributions: 3 distributions of the platform are created: Document Management, Digital Asset Management, and Case Management

2010:

- Series A Funding: $3.3 million from OTC Asset Management
- Introduces Nuxeo Studio: a graphical interface where users can define business objects, types of content, workflows, taxonomy, and user experience. This is the first version of the online configuration IDE (Nuxeo Studio)
- Nuxeo deploys the Nuxeo Marketplace to share Nuxeo Platform add-ons
- Introduces CMIS compliance

2011:

- Introduces Nuxeo Cloud 1.0
  - Host Nuxeo on AWS leveraging S3 and RDS
  - Native Mobile SDKs for iOS and Android

2012:

- Enters the US market
- Introduces Content Routing: a new workflow engine based on Nuxeo technologies

2013:

- Series A Funding: $3.8 million from OTC Asset Management & OTC Extend
- Introduces the Nuxeo Mobile App
- Introduces Nuxeo Drive to handle local file system replication
  - REST API for Document access
  - Integrate Redis

2014:

- Moves Headquarters to New York, NY
- Integrates NoSQL technologies: MongoDB
- Introduces Nuxeo.io: An on-demand container-based hosting

2015:

- Integrates NoSQL technologies: Elasticsearch

2016:

- New funding of $30 Million from Goldman Sachs & Kennett Partners
- Acquisition of Inevo
- UI migrates to WebComponents

2017:

- Launches Nuxeo Content Cloud: a new version of the Nuxeo Cloud offering and a ReactNative mobile application
- Enters the Gartner Magic Quadrant for Content Services Platforms

2018:

- Opens offices in Tokyo, Japan
- CAAS and AI
  - Production-grade deployments on K8S and Openshift
  - Integrates AI services

2021

- Acquisition of Nuxeo by Hyland

== See also ==
- Comparison of content management systems
- List of collaborative software
