= Oracle WebCenter =

Oracle WebCenter is Oracle's portfolio of user engagement software products built on top of the JSF-based Oracle Application Development Framework. There are three main products that make up the WebCenter portfolio, and they can be purchased together as a suite or individually:

- Oracle WebCenter Content (includes WebCenter Imaging)
- Oracle WebCenter Sites
- Oracle WebCenter Portal

Each of these products are in separate but connected markets. WebCenter Content competes in the Enterprise Content Management market. WebCenter Sites competes in the Web Experience Management market, and WebCenter Portal competes in the self-service portal and content delivery market space. Different combinations of these products are frequently used together, so Oracle has bundled them together within the same WebCenter product family.

Oracle WebCenter contains a set of components for building rich web applications, portals, and team collaboration and social sites. Oracle WebCenter is targeted at enterprise and larger accounts that have significant content management requirements and the need to deliver that information with internal or external portals, customer-facing websites or within integrated business applications. Oracle has made a particular effort to integrate WebCenter into its leading business applications such as E-Business Suite, PeopleSoft and JD Edwards so that content can be centrally managed in one location and shared across multiple applications. For the development community and advanced business users, WebCenter provides a development environment that includes WebCenter Framework and WebCenter Services, along with an out-of-the-box application for team collaboration and enterprise social networking. According to Oracle, this is the strategic portal product, eventually replacing Oracle Portal as well as the portal products acquired from BEA.

== Cost ==
The product costs $70,000 per CPU for the WebCenter Services, and $125,000 per CPU for WebCenter Suite. In a production installation, users can expect to deploy at least 4 CPUs as a base system, with likely additional CPUs for development and testing. WebCenter includes embedded US licenses of Oracle Secure Enterprise Search, Oracle Universal Content Management, and Oracle BPEL Process Manager. In addition, WebCenter needs a database to store information: any supported and licensed database such as Oracle database, MS SQL Server or IBM Db2 will work.

== WebCenter product stack ==
There are three major products in the WebCenter product stack.

The base WebCenter Framework allows a user to embed portlets, ADF Taskflows and Pages, content, and customizable components in an Oracle ADF application. All Framework pieces are integrated into the Oracle JDeveloper IDE, providing access to these resources.

WebCenter Services are a set of independently deployable collaboration services. It incorporates Web 2.0 components such as content, collaboration, and communication services – the full list is provided below. WebCenter Services includes Oracle ADF user interface components (called Taskflows) that can be embedded directly into ADF applications. In addition, APIs can be utilized to create custom UIs and to integrate some of these services into non-ADF applications.

Finally, WebCenter Spaces is a closed source application built on WebCenter Framework and Services that offers a prebuilt project collaboration solution. It can be compared with solutions like Microsoft SharePoint and Atlassian Confluence. There are limited mechanisms to extend this application.

Note that there is a product called WebCenter Interaction which is not built on the core WebCenter stack – it is the former Plumtree portal product. Also, all Oracle portal products at Oracle are included in the WebCenter Suite, which is an umbrella of products. Products can be included in the suite regardless of whether they are built on the ADF based WebCenter Framework.

WebCenter comprises furthermore several editions, among others WebCenter Suite Plus, WebCenter Portal, WebCenter Content, WebCenter Sites, WebCenter Sites Satellite Server (a distributed caching mechanism which stores and assembles "pagelets," or elements of output), WebCenter Universal Content Management. Seven WebCenter Adapters and one WCE Management are available.

== WebCenter services capabilities ==
Social Networking Services - Enables users to maximize productivity through collaboration.

- People Connection – Enables users to assemble their business networks like linked-in.
- Discussions – Provides the ability to create and participate in threaded discussion. This is an embedded version of Forums provided by Jive Software.
- Announcements – Enables users to post, personalize, and manage announcements.
- Instant Messaging and Presence (IMP) – Provides the ability to observe the online presence status of other authenticated users (whether online, offline, busy, or idle) and to contact them.
- Blog – Enables blogging functionality within the context of an application.
- Wiki – Self-service, community, oriented-content publishing and sharing.

Shared Services - Provides features for both social networking and personal productivity.

- Documents – Provides content management and storage capabilities, including content upload, file and folder creation and management, file check out, versioning, and so on. WebCenter Portal includes a restricted-use license of Oracle's enterprise content management product called WebCenter Content (formerly known as Universal Content Management).
- Links – Provides the ability to view, access, and associate related information; for example, you can link to a solution document from a discussion thread.
- Lists – Enables users to create, publish, and manage lists. (Available only in WebCenter Spaces).
- Page – Provides the ability to create and manage pages at run time.
- Tags – Provides the ability to assign one or more personally relevant keywords to a given page or document. This feature is similar to the del.cio.us website.
- Events – Provides group calendars, which users can use to schedule meetings, appointments, and any other type of team get-together. This feature requires deployment of a separate calendaring server, which may be Oracle Beehive or Microsoft Exchange (Available only in WebCenter Spaces).

Personal Productivity Services – Focuses on the requirements of an individual, rather than a group.

- Mail – Provides integration with IMAP and SMTP mail servers to enable users to perform simple mail functions such as viewing, reading, creating, and deleting messages, creating messages with attachments, and replying to or forwarding existing messages.
- Notes – Provides the ability to "jot down" and retain quick bits of personally relevant information (Available only in WebCenter Spaces).
- Recent Activities – Provides a summary view of recent changes to documents, discussions, and announcements.
- RSS – Provides the ability to publish content from WebCenter Web 2.0 Services as news feeds in RSS 2.0 and Atom 1.0 formats.
- Search – Provides the ability to search tags, services, an application, or an entire site. This makes use of a license limited version of Oracle's Secure Enterprise Search (SES) product.
- Worklist – Provides a personal, at-a-glance view of business processes that require attention. These can include a request for document review and other types of business process that come directly from enterprise applications.

== Official and de facto standards support ==
WebCenter Framework supports the following standards:

- J2EE 1.4 and above (Java EE)
- JSR 168 and JSR 286
- WSRP 1.0 and 2.0
- JCR 1.0
- JSF
- JSR 116

== Release of WebCenter 11g R1 Patch Set 5 (PS5) ==
On 22 February 2012 Oracle released WebCenter 11g Release 1 Patch Set 5. It includes many bug fixes in addition to several new enhancements. This patch set is mainly targeted at releasing customer bug fixes.

== Release of WebCenter 11g R1 Patch Set 3 (PS3) ==
In January 2011 Oracle released WebCenter 11g Release 1 Patch Set 3. As the converged portal platform, this is a major new release with many features integrated from previously acquired portal products, including a greatly improved and flexible portal framework, improved GUI, personalization server, brand new navigation model, support for hierarchical pages and spaces, JSR 286, improved performance, and more.

WebCenter Framework and Services lacks support for these notable technologies:

- Internet Explorer 6.0
- Eclipse (software) IDE but Oracle JDeveloper is provided as part of the suite of tools.
