= WAPI =

WAPI or Wapi may refer to:

== Broadcasting ==
- WAPI (AM), a radio station licensed to Birmingham, Alabama, US
- WJQX (former call sign WAPI-FM), a radio station licensed to Helena, Alabama, US
- WVTM-TV (former call sign WAPI-TV), a television station licensed to Birmingham, Alabama, US

== Other uses ==
- Mathilda Batlayeri Airport (ICAO code), Indonesia
- Wapi Rural LLG, a local-level government in Papua New Guinea
- WLAN Authentication and Privacy Infrastructure, a Chinese national standard for wireless LANs
- Workflow APIs and interchange formats, a specification from the Workflow Management Coalition (WfMC)
- World Association of Professional Investigators, a professional association based in the UK
