= Apache Jackrabbit =

Open-source Java content repository

- Developer: Apache Software Foundation
- Stable release: 2.20.6 / July 7, 2022; 3 years ago
- Preview release: 2.21.12 / September 11, 2022; 3 years ago
- Repository: github.com/apache/jackrabbit
- Written in: Java
- Operating system: Cross-platform
- Type: Content repository
- License: Apache License 2.0
- Website: jackrabbit.apache.org

Apache Jackrabbit is an open source content repository for the Java platform. The Jackrabbit project was started on August 28, 2004, when Day Software licensed an initial implementation of the Java Content Repository API (JCR). Jackrabbit was also used as the reference implementation of JSR-170, specified within the Java Community Process. The project graduated from the Apache Incubator on March 15, 2006, and is now a Top Level Project of the Apache Software Foundation.

JCR specifies an API for application developers (and application frameworks) to use for interaction with modern content repositories that provide content services such as searching, versioning, transactions, etc.

== Features ==
- Fine and coarse-grained content access
- Hierarchical content
- Structured content
- Node types and mixins
- Property types - text, number, date
- Binary properties
- XPath queries
- SQL queries
- Unstructured content
- Import and export
- Referential integrity
- Access control
- Versioning
- JTA support
- Observation
- Locking
- Clustering
- Multiple persistence models

== See also ==
- Apache Sling - a web framework for building applications on top of Apache Jackrabbit
- Jahia - Open Source ECM based on Apache Jackrabbit
- Magnolia (CMS) - an Open Source content management system based on Apache Jackrabbit
- OpenKM - Open Source KM based on Apache Jackrabbit
- Sakai Project - Open Source Collaboration and Learning Environment based on Apache Sling and Apache Jackrabbit
- Adobe Experience Manager - experience management system based on Apache Jackrabbit Oak, successor of the Day CQ content management system acquired by Adobe in 2010
