= Jcrom =

Software framework

JCROM
- Developers: Olafur Gauti Gudmundsson, Nicolas Dos Santos
- Stable release: 2.1.0 / June 19, 2013
- Written in: Java
- Type: Content repository
- License: Apache License 2.0
- Website: jcrom.googlecode.com

JCROM is an acronym that stands for Java Content Repository (JCR) Object Mapper. It is a simple and lightweight annotation-based framework for mapping Plain Old Java Objects (POJOs) to/from nodes in a JCR. This is commonly called Object Content Mapping.

JCR specifies an API for application developers (and application frameworks) to use for interaction with modern content repositories that provide content services such as searching, versioning, transactions, etc.

There are object mapping frameworks for JDBC, like Hibernate and the Enterprise JavaBeans spec. There are also solutions for mapping to/from XML. The vision of JCROM is to provide the same for JCR.

== Features ==
- Annotation based (needs Java 1.5)
- Lightweight, minimal external dependencies
- Works with any JCR implementation (e.g. Apache Jackrabbit, ModeShape, Adobe CQ, ...)
- DAO support
- Works with the Spring Framework and Spring Extension JCR
- Works with Google Guice
