= Web Services for Remote Portlets =

Computer network protocol

Web Services for Remote Portlets (WSRP) is an OASIS-approved network protocol standard designed for communications with remote portlets.

== Overview ==
The WSRP specification defines a web service interface for interacting with presentation-oriented web services. Initial work was produced through the joint efforts of the Web Services for Interactive Applications (WSIA) and Web Services for Remote Portlets (WSRP) OASIS Technical Committees. With the approval of WSRP v1 as an OASIS standard in September, 2003, these two technical committees merged and continued the work as the Web Services for Remote Portlets (WSRP) OASIS Technical Committee.

Scenarios that motivate WSRP functionality include:

- content hosts, such as portal servers, providing portlets as presentation-oriented web services that can be used by aggregation engines;
- content aggregators, such as portal servers, consuming presentation-oriented web services provided by portal or non-portal content providers and integrating them into a portal framework.

== Implementation ==
The WSRP specification does not make any statements as to implementation. Java's portlet specification, JSR 168, and WSRP are not competing technologies. JSR 168 may be used to define a portlet, and WSRP may be used to define a portlet's operations to remote containers. JSR 168 portlets and WSRP may be used together to define a portlet and to provide remote operations. Similarly, .NET portlets may be created for use with WSRP. Interoperability between JSR 168 and .NET WSRP implementations has been demonstrated.

There are several WSRP implementations to assist developers:

- The Oracle WebCenter provides a standards based implementation of WSRP 1.0 and 2.0 producer and consumers.
- The IBM WebSphere Portal provides an implementation of WSRP 1.0 and 2.0 producer and consumers.
- Up to version 7.0 the Liferay Portal / DXP provides an implementation of WSRP 1.0 and 2.0 producer and consumers available in both its commercial Enterprise Edition and open source Community Edition.
- Microsoft provides a WSRP producer and consumer WebPart for SharePoint 2007, but only a WSRP consumer WebPart for SharePoint 2010 and SharePoint 2013.
- The OpenPortal WSRP project's goal is to create a high quality, enterprise-class WSRP v1 and v2 producer and consumer with an associated developer community.
- The GateIn Portal project (JBoss & eXo Platform), provides an implementation of both WSRP v1 and v2 (as of GateIn 3.1.0), producer and consumer using GateIn and GateIn Portlet Container.
- Apache WSRP4J was an Apache Incubator subproject spearheaded by IBM with the stated goal of "kick starting the broad adoption" of WSRP. WSRP4J was designed to assist in the development and deployment of WSRP v1 services. WSRP4J was in incubator status, primarily due to patent concerns revolving around the WSRP specification. Given WSRP4J's incubator status, the project did not produce formal releases. The project has been terminated in 2010.

The first release, WSRP v1, provided a limited interoperability platform. Further versions of WSRP v1 were abandoned so that effort could be concentrated on WSRP v2. WSRP v2 augments the initial standard with cross-portlet coordination and access management features. This major update to the standard permits a more useful integration of multiple content sources, regardless of whether they are local or remote, into a new web application. In addition, WSRP v2 supports Web 2.0 technologies, such as AJAX and REST, without requiring them. WSRP v2 was approved by OASIS on April 1, 2008.

== See also ==
- Apache JServ Protocol
- Web services
- Java Portlet Specification
- Enterprise portal
