= ODMA (disambiguation) =

ODMA is Open Document Management API.

ODMA may also refer to:

- ODMA (drug), an MDMA analogue
- Opportunity-Driven Multiple Access, a telecommunications standard
- Oxford Dictionary of the Middle Ages, a publication by Arizona Center for Medieval and Renaissance Studies
