= O3Spaces =

O3Spaces B.V.
- Company type: Private
- Founded: 2005; 21 years ago in Gouda, The Netherlands
- Headquarters: Gouda, The Netherlands
- Area served: Worldwide
- Products: O3Spaces Workplace
- Website: www.o3spaces.com

O3Spaces is a document management system developed by O3Spaces B.V.. It is built by a team of software engineers based in the Netherlands using OpenOffice.org, StarOffice, and ODF-centric applications as enterprise office and collaboration services. The product is written in Java, and based on the Tomcat server with a PostgreSQL backend (other databases are also supported). O3Spaces works by providing users a single web-based team environment, with built-in search capabilities and an optional Desktop Assistant. Its search functionality is said to work across PDF, ODF, and Microsoft Office document formats. Currently Firefox, Internet Explorer and Safari are supported.

== History ==
The first preview release was presented to the public at the 2006 CeBIT tradeshow in Hanover, Germany. The first official release, 2.0, was released in December 2006. Version 2.2.0 was released in December 2007. On June 25, 2008, version 2.3.0 beta, was released, adding support for the Mac OS X platform. On September 19, 2008, O3Spaces Workplace 2.3.0, was released to the public, incorporating Mac OS X support (server & client) and the Safari web browser. On January 6, 2009, O3 Spaces Workplace 2.4.0 was released, incorporating email integration together with further additions. The current version is O3Spaces Workplace 4.1, which incorporates Online Document Preview and Document Solutions like Scanning, Contract Management, Template Management and E-mail Archiving.

== Features ==
Much like SharePoint and the free Windows SharePoint Services (WSS), O3Spaces contains the concept of workspaces. These are working areas document repositories created for a particular task or project. In addition to document storage, a workspace contains a set of standard collaboration tools. These include team calendaring and a discussion forum for communications and dispute resolutions. O3Spaces Workplace provides three main entry points:

1. a Web 2.0 AJAX browser based environment
2. a desktop client with Workplace repository file browser; the Workplace Assistant
3. the Office suite and E-mail client plug-ins for OpenOffice.org / StarOffice, Microsoft Office, Microsoft Outlook & Mozilla Thunderbird

In addition, O3Spaces Workplace delivers:

1. Template Management
2. Repository access based on open standards:
  1. WebDAV
  2. Opensearch
  3. CMIS
3. Document security (Role based access control, Secure Connections, Backup, Restore & Archiving)
4. LDAP Integration
5. Integration into Zimbra & Zarafa

The repository can be accessed in several ways. External applications can access the repository by using the WebDAV or the CMIS protocol. End users can control the repository using a web browser or using the desktop client.

=== Browser based ===
The browser based repository access is a full AJAX application (built on the Echo 3 framework). The browser environment can be split into a so-called Studio environment and a so-called Spaces environment. The Studio entry point is the entry point to be used by repository administrators. The Spaces web application is the end-user entry point.

=== Desktop Client ===
The desktop client (called Workplace Assistant) can be used to access the repository without a web browser. This desktop client can install the appropriate plugins into supported Office suites.

== Cross platform ==
O3Spaces Workplace is available for different platforms like for instance Linux, Solaris, Windows and Mac OS X. O3Spaces Workplace has several partners supporting its technology, including Mandriva, Sun Microsystems Inc., Xandros, Translucent Technologies, etc.

== Configurations ==
The package comes in three different configurations: On Demand, Enterprise, and Workgroup. The On Demand configuration is a Software as a Service (SaaS) model, can be accessed from anywhere, and includes feature upgrades through the life of the contract. The Workgroup and Enterprise editions are deployed in the company network and can also be used with secure Internet access.

== See also ==
- Document management system
