= Kaitain =

Kaitain may stand for

- An alternative name of Alpha Piscium in the constellation of Pisces.
- Kaitain (Dune), home planet of Imperial House Corrino in Frank Herbert's fictional Dune universe
- Code name for OpenCms v5.0.x
