= Repository =

Repository may refer to:

== Archives and online databases ==
- Content repository, a database with an associated set of data management tools, allowing application-independent access to the content
- Disciplinary repository (or subject repository), an online archive containing works or data associated with a particular subject area
- Information repository, a central place in which an aggregation of data is kept and maintained in an organized way, usually in computer storage
- Institutional repository, an archive for keeping digital copies of the intellectual output of an institution
- Open-access repository, a platform for freely available research results

== Publications ==
- The Repository, a newspaper in Ohio
- Ackermann's Repository, a British periodical published 1809–1829

== Software ==
- Repository (version control), a data structure which stores metadata for a set of files or directory structure
- Software repository, a storage location for software packages
