= Edge Technologies =

American software company

Edge Technologies, Inc.
- Type: Public
- Traded as: TSX-V: CTRL; OTCQB: UNFYF; FWB: Q5I
- Industry: Enterprise software IT service management
- Founded: 1993
- Headquarters: Arlington, Virginia, United States
- Key people: Jim Barrett (CEO)
- Products: edgeCore
- Website: edgeti.com

Edge Technologies, Inc. is an American software company, focusing on the integration of secure web applications. Edge provides software products and enterprise services to corporations and government agencies. Edge was founded in 1993 and is headquartered in Arlington, Virginia. In 2017, the company was acquired by Lotus Innovations Fund. Edge (edgeTI) became a publicly traded company in January 2022.

== Products ==
- enVision is the first software product to provide a web interface for HP Openview and Network Node Manager.
- Released in 2000, enPortal is a secure, integration Web portal. It lets service providers or large enterprise customers view data from disparate network-management systems through a single Web interface. The enPortal customer base is primarily corporations and government agencies which use network management applications. enPortal offers prepackaged Product Integration Modules (PIMs). PIMs provide pre-built integration with commonly used applications, including products from Concord Communications, Hewlett-Packard, InfoVista, IBM/Tivoli Netcool, and Remedy. Single sign-on allows the user to log into enPortal, which then automatically logs into all of the other applications integrated into the portal. The software also can automate workflow, normalize and correlate events, and take action based on user-defined rules.

== See also ==
- Java Portlet specification
