= Document controller =

Practitioner of documents and records control

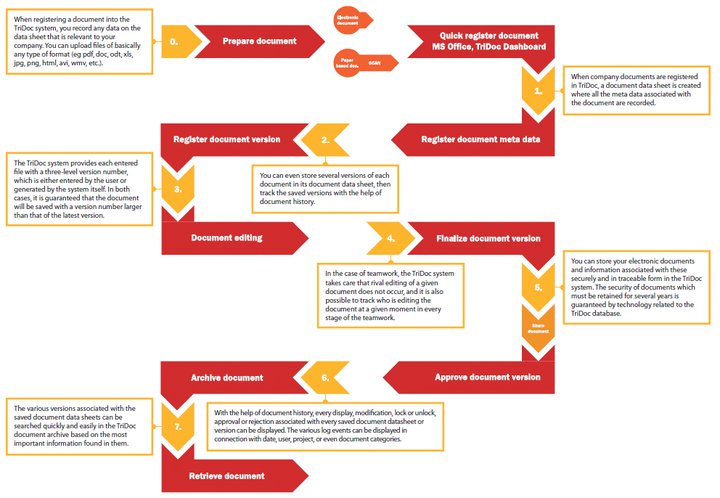
- Life cycle of a document

Occupation
- Names: Document controller
- Occupation type: Profession
- Activity sectors: Business

Description
- Competencies: Document management communication skills, analytical skills, and critical thinking skills
- Education required: In some countries Bachelor's degree or master's degree
- Fields of employment: private corporations, financial industry, government

A document controller is a professional responsible for the efficient management and organization of documents within an organization, ensuring the integrity, accessibility, and compliance of critical records. This role spans various industries, including construction, engineering, healthcare, manufacturing, and more.

Document controllers oversee the creation, version control, quality assurance, and secure storage of documents to maintain accuracy, consistency, and regulatory compliance.

== Role and responsibilities ==
Document controllers are entrusted with a range of responsibilities to ensure the smooth flow of information within organizations. Their key tasks include the following:

- Document management: Creating, organizing, and managing documents, both physical and digital. Maintaining a comprehensive record of all documents, ensuring easy retrieval when needed.
- Quality assurance: Maintaining document accuracy, consistency, and compliance with relevant standards and regulations. Proofreading and verification of documents.
- Access control: Managing document access permissions, ensuring that sensitive information is only available to authorized personnel.
- Version control: Track document revisions, maintaining a history of changes and updates to prevent errors and ensure that the most current version of a document is always accessible.
- Data retention and archiving: Overseeing the proper archiving and retention of documents according to organizational policies and legal requirements.

== Industries and sectors ==
Document controllers are employed across various industries and sectors, including but not limited to the following:

- Construction: Document controllers manage blueprints, plans, permits, and compliance documents to ensure projects run smoothly and adhere to regulations.
- Engineering: Oversee the documentation of design specifications, technical drawings, and project reports.
- Healthcare: Manage patient records, medical reports, and compliance documentation.
- Manufacturing: Handle product specifications, quality control documents, and production records.
- Oil and gas: Manage technical documentation, safety records, and compliance reports to ensure integrity and safety of operations.

Document controllers adapt their role to suit the specific documentation needs of each industry.
