= Bluenog =

Software company

- Developer: Bluenog
- Stable release: ICE 4.5 / June 23, 2009
- Type: enterprise software
- Website: www.bluenog.com

Bluenog was an enterprise software company. The company's flagship product was Bluenog ICE, an enterprise 2.0 application development platform built on pre-integrated open-source content management, collaboration, enterprise portal and business intelligence projects. Headquartered in Piscataway Township, N.J., Bluenog was also a Red Hat, Oracle and Actuate partner.

== History ==
Bluenog was formed in 2006 using both open source and commercial software. It secured $4 million in venture capital from NewSpring Capital in 2008. Bluenog received an additional $1 million through New Jersey's Edison Innovation Fund in April 2009.

== Products ==
Following the venture capital funding, Bluenog released ICE 4.0. The latest version of the product, ICE 4.5, was released in June 2009 at the Enterprise 2.0 conference in Boston.

== Awards ==
In 2009, Bluenog won two technology awards: InformationWeek Startup 50 and RedHerring 100.
