= UPortal =

uPortal is a Java-based framework for creating enterprise web portals. It is sponsored by Apereo (formerly Jasig), a consortium of educational institutions and commercial affiliates sponsoring open source software projects focused on higher education. uPortal is free software under the Apache License 2.0. uPortal has integrated Apache Software Foundation's Pluto software to become JSR 168 and JSR 286 compliant allowing it to host portlets.
