= Magnolia (software) =

Open-source digital platform

- Original authors: Boris Kraft & Pascal Mangold
- Developer: Magnolia International Ltd
- Release: 15 November 2003
- Stable release: 6.4.1 / 11 December 2025; 7 months ago
- Written in: Java
- Operating system: Cross-platform
- Type: Content management system
- License: Community Edition: GPLv3; DX Core: EULA
- Website: www.magnolia-cms.com
- Repository: git.magnolia-cms.com/scm/platform/main.pub.git

Magnolia is an enterprise digital experience platform (DXP), which began as an open-source content management system (CMS) and is based on Content repository API for Java.

It is developed and maintained by Magnolia International Ltd., headquartered in Basel, Switzerland with other offices around the world.

Magnolia is used by organisations to create, manage, and deliver digital content. It includes features such as content versioning, workflow management, personalisation, and multi-language support. It can be run as a self-hosted DXP or with Magnolia’s managed DX Cloud services with a Platform-as-a-Service (PaaS) implementation.

== Major releases ==
Version	Date	Key Features
6.4	2025-11-12	New UI Forms for accessibility; AI Accelerator with automated metadata; Page-editor apps for custom channels; Swift Publication; External DAM binary storage.
6.3	2024-09-04	Improved search, usability, and UI experience; Enhanced overall system performance; Refined flexibility of configuration.
6.2	2020-03-27	Visual SPA Editor; Multisource content through declarative REST; Integrated User Experience; DAM Connector Pack; Marketing Automation Connector Pack.
6.1	2019-06-26	Product repackaging: DX Core and Community Edition; Connector Packs, Live Copy, many Find Bar and UI improvements.
6.0	2018-11-30	Find Bar with AI-based search result ranking, image recognition and tagging, content models via content types, new UI framework, overhauled user interface.
5.7	2018-06-25	GDPR readiness, Apache Solr for asset indexing, field name aliases, runtime compatibility with Java 9 and Java 10, Java specification baseline at Java EE 8.
5.6	2017-11-15	Content tags, new REST API delivery endpoint, software BOM for 3rd-party dependencies, OAuth 2.0, Vaadin 8, Log4j 2.
5.5	2016-11-15	Definitions app, navigation functions, Magnolia CLI, themes in YAML, many UX improvements; CORE 5.5 uses H2 as the default db.
5.4	2015-07-03	Magnolia Templating Essentials, light development, configuration by YAML files, unified resource loading.
5.3	2014-06-24	Personalization (p13n), workflow tasks, improved DAM API, content connector, marketing tags manager app.
5.2	2013-11-22	REST module, more apps using new Vaadin UI, improved migration process.
5.1	2013-10-09	Internationalization (i18n), bulk actions, publishing workflow, customizable apps.
5.0	2013-06-20	New UI based on HTML5 and Vaadin. Framework for creating task-oriented apps.
4.5.1	2012-03-13	New templating API, multichannel publishing, JCR 2.0
4.1	2009-06-12	Digital asset management, image generation, commenting.
4.0.1	2009-03-06	Standard templating kit.
3.0	2006-11-15	Enterprise edition with features such as LDAP authentication.
2.0	2004-11-15	Usability improvements.
1.0	2003-11-15	Initial release.

Latest branch
Older branch, still supported
Older branch in extended end of life, partially supported
End of Life

== Architecture ==
Magnolia CMS is a Java-based content management system that uses a JCR repository to store, retrieve and search data. In this respect Magnolia is similar to Adobe Experience Manager, Hippo CMS and Jahia which also use JCR. Magnolia uses Apache Jackrabbit, the JCR reference implementation by default.

== Modules ==
Magnolia is built with a modular architecture. The system core and features such as the page editor, digital asset management and cache are packaged into separate modules. The module mechanism is also used to package and deploy websites built with Magnolia. The templates, themes and functionality used on a website are split into separate modules.

Magnolia International Ltd. provides commonly used feature modules such as Commenting and Personalisation. The user community has developed further modules for specific tasks such as for checking broken links.

== Users ==
Magnolia has clients around the world, in sectors including financial services, government, pharmaceuticals, manufacturing, and e-commerce.
