= OpenKM =

Document management system

OpenKM Document Management System.
- Developer: Open Knowledge Management System S.L.
- Release: November 2005; 20 years ago
- Stable release: 6.3.11 (Community Edition) / June 21, 2021; 5 years ago
- Written in: Java, JavaScript
- Operating system: Cross-platform
- Type: Document management, open-source
- License: Enterprise Edition is proprietary; Community Edition is GNU GPL
- Website: www.openkm.com www.openkm.us
- Repository: https://github.com/openkm/document-management-system

OpenKM is a document management system that provides a web interface for managing nonspecific files. It has a Free/Libre Community Edition, and a proprietary Enterprise Edition. OpenKM includes a content repository, Lucene indexing, and jBPM workflow. The OpenKM system was developed using open technology (Java, Tomcat, Lucene, Hibernate, Spring).

== History ==
In 2005, two developers involved in open source technologies decided to start an open-source project based on high-level technologies to build a document management system that they chose to call OpenKM.

At the project's outset, it received the help of Spanish government funds from the PROFIT PROJECT. At the end of 2006, the first OpenKM version was released.

In 2011 and 2012, OpenKM began to expand its markets, translating the application to over 35 languages, allowing the Document Management System to be used worldwide by creating a network of partners.

In 2017 OpenKM established subsidiaries in France, Germany, Indonesia, Italy, Malaysia, the MENA region, and the USA. In 2018 OpenKM Poland in 2019 OpenKM Hungary, OpenKM Serbia, and OpenKM China, and in 2021 OpenKM Russia were incorporated into the OpenKM worldwide network of subsidiaries.

== License ==
OpenKM uses the GNU General Public License (Version 2) license.

== Usage ==
OpenKM is a web-based document management application, so only a web browser is needed to use it. OpenKM implements a Web 2.0 user interface framework based on GWT (Google Web Toolkit) that supports Firefox, Internet Explorer, Safari, Chromium and Google Chrome and the latest versions of Opera. Also available, a user interface adapted for mobile devices based on JQuery Mobile, Add-ins for Microsoft Office, WebDAV and CIFS protocol for connecting OpenKM repository as a network drive and FTP protocol.

== Architecture ==
OpenKM is developed using Java technology based on Java EE standards and the JBoss application server. Therefore, it can be installed and executed on various platforms (Linux, Windows, etc.)

The OpenKM architecture is based on the following technologies:

- Apache Tomcat also might be deployed into others like JBoss Application Server
- Java EE (JDK 1.8 or higher)
- GWT (Google Web Toolkit - Ajax)
- Spring Framework
- RESTFul
- Lucene

Due to its architecture, OpenKM can work on any operating system — Unix, Linux, Windows — though Linux is recommended by the developers. Data can be stored in a directory or in any RDBMS (Oracle, PostgreSQL, MySQL, SQL Server, etc.)

== See also ==
- Document Management
- List of content management systems
- List of collaborative software
- Enterprise content management
