= Content repository API for Java =

Specification for a Java platform application programming interface

Content Repository API for Java (JCR) is a specification for a Java platform application programming interface (API) to access content repositories in a uniform manner. The content repositories are used in content management systems to keep the content data and also the metadata used in content management systems (CMS) such as versioning metadata. The specification was developed under the Java Community Process as JSR-170 (Version 1), and as JSR-283 (version 2). The main Java package is javax.jcr.

== Overview ==
A JCR is a type of object database tailored to storing, searching, and retrieving hierarchical data. The JCR API grew out of the needs of content management systems, which require storing documents and other binary objects with associated metadata; however, the API is applicable to many additional types of applications. In addition to object storage, the JCR provides: APIs for versioning of data; transactions; observation of changes in data; and import or export of data to XML in a standard way.

== Data structure ==
The data in a JCR consists of a tree of nodes with associated properties. Data is stored in the properties, which may hold simple values such as numbers and strings or binary data of arbitrary length. Nodes may optionally have one or more types associated with them which dictate the kinds of properties, number, and type of child nodes, and certain behavioral characteristics of the nodes. Nodes may point to other nodes via a special reference type property. In this way, nodes in a JCR offer both referential integrity and the object-oriented concept of inheritance. Additional node types include the referenceable node type, which allows the user to reference said node through use of a universally unique identifier. Another popular type is the versionable type. This makes the repository track a document's history and store copies of each version of the document.

== Queries ==
A JCR can export portions of its tree to XML in two standard formats and can import hierarchies directly from XML. JSR 283 compliant implementations must support a standardized form of SQL for queries and a query object model QOM. JSR 283 deprecates the XPath query language defined in JSR 170. The Apache Jackrabbit reference implementation of JCR also supports the integration of the Apache Lucene search engine to give full text searches of data in the repository.

== Available implementations ==
Both JSRs are led by David Nüscheler of Adobe Systems (formerly of Day Software). Day had both a commercial JCR implementation called Content Repository Extreme (CRX) and was involved in the open source Apache Jackrabbit JCR, which had its 2.0 release in January 2010. ModeShape is another open source JCR implementation that supports JSR-283. Adobe Experience Manager (AEM), Jahia, Hippo CMS and Magnolia are Enterprise Content Management systems built on the JCR API, using Jackrabbit as its repository by default, but able to plug in any other JSR-170 certified repository implementation. JSR-170 is also supported by Oracle Beehive, Oracle's enterprise collaboration software. The eXo JCR by eXo Platform is an open source repository with paid commercial support and documentation. Many other commercial vendors are working on JCR compatibility and products. Alfresco is an open source content management system which provides a JCR API onto their repository. GX released the new community version of its Web enterprise content management (ECM) platform, based natively on Apache Jackrabbit and JSR.

PHP adaptions have been started by TYPO3, translating the Java API to PHP. The PHPCR interfaces are also implemented by Jackalope, a PHP frontend talking to the Jackrabbit backend through the WebDAV interface, and Midgard, a cross-language content repository.

== See also ==
- Content Management Interoperability Services (CMIS), another content repository API
