= Content repository =

A content repository or content store is a database of digital content with an associated set of data management, search and access methods allowing application-independent access to the content, rather like a digital library, but with the ability to store and modify content in addition to searching and retrieving. The content repository acts as the storage engine for a larger application such as a content management system or a document management system, which adds a user interface on top of the repository's application programming interface.

== Advantages provided by repositories ==
- Common rules for data access allow many applications to work with the same content without interrupting the data.
- They give out signals when changes happen, letting other applications using the repository know that something has been modified, which enables collaborative data management.
- Developers can deal with data using programs that are more compatible with the desktop programming environment.
- The data model is scriptable when users use a content repository.

== Content repository features ==
A content repository may provide functionality such as:

- Add/edit/delete content
- Hierarchy and sort order management
- Query / search
- Versioning
- Access control
- Import / export
- Locking
- Life-cycle management
- Retention and holding / records management

== Examples ==
- Apache Jackrabbit
- ModeShape

== Applications ==
- Content management
- Document management
- Digital asset management
- Records management
- Revision control
- Social collaboration
- Web content management

== Standards and specification ==
- Content repository API for Java
- WebDAV
- Content Management Interoperability Services

== See also ==
- Information repository
- Content (media)
