= OpenWGA =

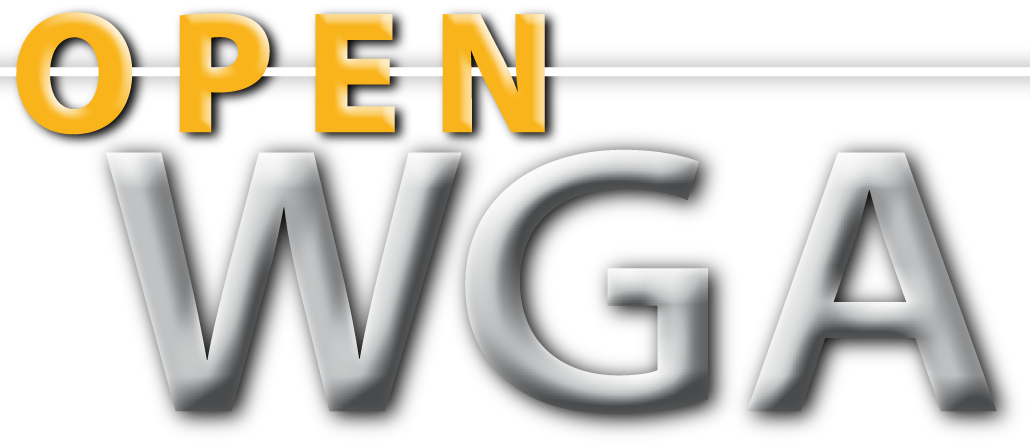

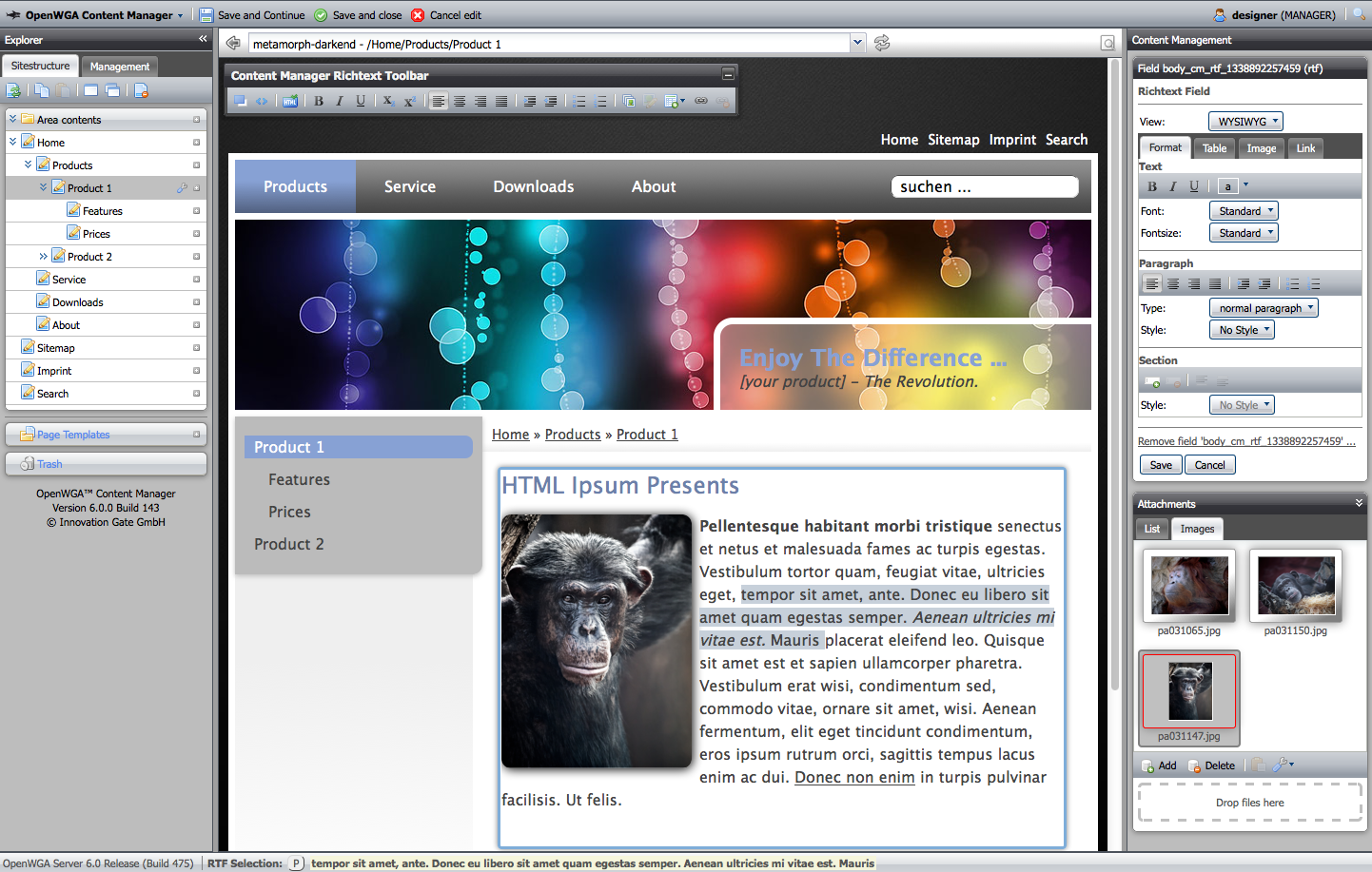
- Screenshot OpenWGA Content Manager
- Developer: Innovation Gate GmbH
- Stable release: 7.11.6.0 / 2024-11-06[±]
- Written in: Java, JavaScript
- Operating system: Cross-platform
- Platform: Java platform
- Size: 100MB
- Available in: English (default), German
- Type: Content Management System
- License: GNU GPL 3.0 or higher
- Website: https://www.openwga.com
- Repository: github.com/Innovationgate/OpenWGA

OpenWGA is a content management system (CMS) running on the Java Enterprise Edition Platform. It is used to build, manage and publish websites and content-centric web applications. The system is developed and maintained by German company Innovation Gate GmbH.

== Components and Editions of the CMS platform ==
The central part of the platform is the OpenWGA Server, a web server process responsible for publishing web applications. It itself is a web application of the Java Enterprise Edition Platform and is available in two editions:

- The Community Edition contains the content publishing engine, support for storing content data on MySQL, PostgreSQL, Microsoft SQL Server and HSQLDB databases and includes basic capabilities for user authentication. It is licensed as Open Source Software under GNU GPLv3 or higher and usable without fee. A special exception to the GNU GPL allows distribution of custom-licensed OpenWGA plugins along with the OpenWGA server.
- The Enterprise Edition builds upon the Community Edition to add support for database platforms (Lotus Domino, IBM DB2, Oracle Database), user authentication systems (LDAP directory servers, multiple shared authentication) and external data sources (CMIS repositories, Lotus Domino Databases) that are considered "enterprise grade" by the product creators. It consists of the GPL licensed community edition plus a custom-licensed "Enterprise Plugin" containing the additional features. Access to the Enterprise Edition is available via a paid subscription model by Innovation Gate GmbH.

Another part of the platform is the OpenWGA developer studio, an Integrated development environment for developing and testing OpenWGA web applications, based on the Eclipse IDE framework.

== History ==
OpenWGA was long time developed under the name of WGA and was by this time a commercial Web Content Management System only available to the German market. With releasing it under Open Source License it was rebranded to OpenWGA. The acronym originally stood for "WebGate Anywhere", containing a reference to the predecessor software "Webgate", a CMS running on the IBM Lotus Domino Platform. The WGA/OpenWGA software has no connection with Windows Genuine Advantage, also known as WGA.

Release	Version	Notable Enhancements
2001	1.0	No complete CMS but merely a Java-based interface server for adding content data to CMS "WebGate" via third party authoring clients like Microsoft Word and other office products
2002	2.0	Complete CMS server on J2EE platform storing content (and design) data in Lotus Domino Databases
2003	2.1	New administrative tools: "WGA Admin Page" for monitoring and "WGA Manager" (Java Webstart Application) for configuring the server; Introduction of WebTML actions
February 2004	2.2	First version of WebTML portlet framework; Switching data interface for Lotus Domino to DIIOP CORBA protocol instead of "native interface", fixing various resource exhaustion problems
July 2004	3.0	Introduction of content storage for relational database systems; Reworked Browser Authoring Interface; WebTML forms
December 2004	3.1	WGA Scheduler; Incremental Content Store Synchronisation
2005	3.2	Integrated Lucene fulltext index; TMLScript overhaul; ACL Roles
2006	3.3	External storage of designs in design directories; Design sharing; WebTML forms and labels
2007	4.0	Focus on Web application development; WGA Plugins architecture; Modernization of WebTML portlet framework incl. AJAX functionality; OpenWGA Content Manager replaces "Browser Authoring Interface"; WGA Design Assistant allows configuration of WGA design directories
2008	4.1	Optimized content file handling with resource-neutral fetching of large file data; Addressing content via human-readable title path URLs
April 2010	5.0	Release as OpenWGA Community Edition under GPL; Refactored and simplified administrative model including new OpenWGA admin client; OpenWGA developer studio; Content relations; Exposure to international market
August 2010	5.1	Pluggable language behaviour; Beginning Drag&Drop support in OpenWGA Content Manager; Externalize serving of large files to HTTP server
November 2010	5.2	CMIS connectivity; Support for PostgreSQL databases; Image editing features inside OpenWGA Content Manager
March 2011	5.3	Content modules; Virtual Hosts; Search Engine Optimizations
July 2011	5.4	Plugin Store; Inheritable read access restrictions for pages; Content Module Templates; Customizable application designs
December 2011	5.5	Basic Website Kit; HDBModel application framework; Support for Microsoft SQLServer in Community Edition
May 2012	6.0	New base stream with 3 years of support; Basic App Kit; Shared server connection pool
May 2013	6.1	OpenWGA Server API
September 2013	6.2	WebTML portlet applications capable of multi-window usage; Problem Registry; Services APIs
April 2014	6.3	File derivates; RESTful web service; cluster communication framework; Optimized "distinct file contents" storage for binary data
September 2014	7.0	New base stream with 3 years of support; Customization of Authoring UI; Performance Improvements
February 2015	7.1	Switch to unoconv service for the analysis and indexing of office files; Refactored fulltext index, separately indexing distinct file attachments
June 2016	7.2	Version 7.2 released: MVC: Added TMLScript controller and renderer modules
October 2016	7.3	Version 7.3 released: New SEO panel
March 2017	7.4	Version 7.4 released: Language dependent optimised fulltext index
December 2017	7.5	Version 7.5 released
July 2018	7.6	Version 7.6 released with new Content Manager UI
July 2019	7.7	Version 7.7 released

== Content management characteristics ==
OpenWGA provides the following characteristic features known in content management and publishing:

- Hierarchically organized, versionable, multi language content in a freely definable structure
- Storage of binary content data along with content
- Automatic fulltext indexing of content
- Browser-based WYSIWYG content authoring
- Configurable read/write authorisations on multiple levels: Application, Hierarchy, Document
- Approval Workflow
- Web service access to content data via RESTful HTTP webservice, CMIS, SOAP and WebDAV
- Synchronisation of Content Data across servers
- User personalisation via individual user profiles

== Template / Application development ==
OpenWGA uses its own templating languages called WebTML and TMLScript. WebTML is a syntax of XML-formatted tags, prefixed with "tml:", that mark dynamic parts of page templates, providing mainly data output and flow control beside offering higher level features. TMLScript is an expression language used to specify expressions and define routines in WebTML that complies to the rules of JavaScript Version 1.6.

The following example demonstrates the usage of WebTML and TMLScript (inside the "condition" attribute) in a HTML page template:

  <tml:meta name="title"/>
  
  <tml:case condition="!isEmpty('abstract')">
    <div id="abstract">
      <tml:item name="abstract" editor="rtf"/>
    </div>
  </tml:case>
  
  <div id="body">
    <tml:item name="body" editor="rtf"/> 
  </div>

The design of an OpenWGA web application is either provided as OpenWGA design directory for direct editing or as an OpenWGA plugin for wider distribution.

== See also ==
- List of content management systems
