= OpenCms =

Content management system

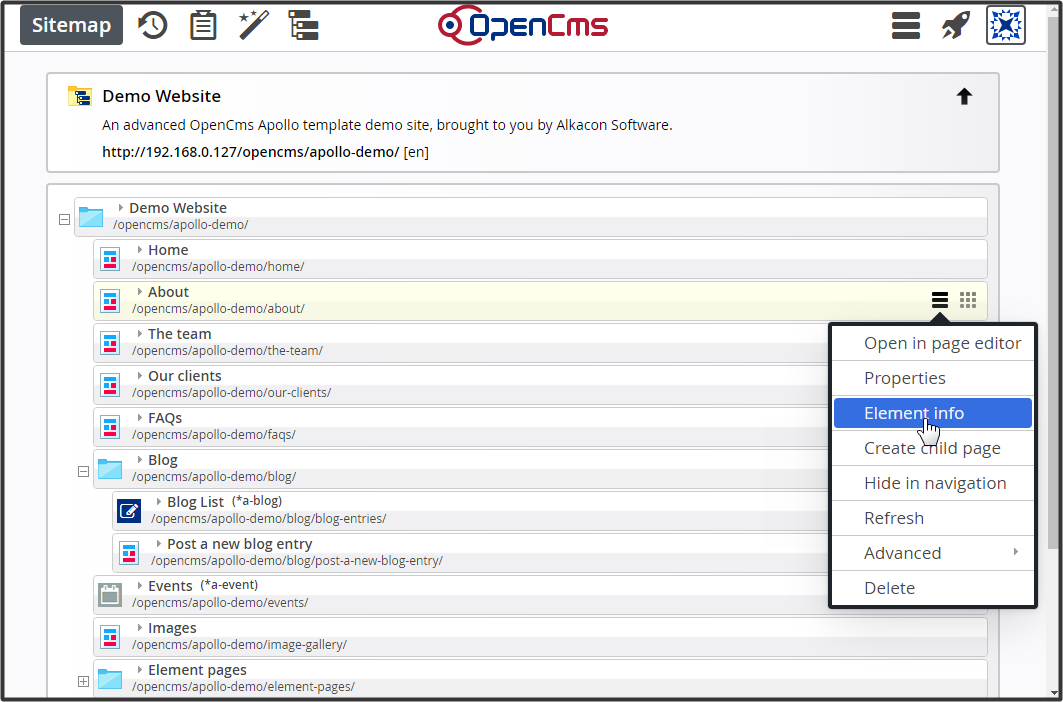
- The sitemap editor of OpenCms
- Developers: Alkacon Software and the OpenCms community
- Stable release: 21 / 2026-04-14[±]
- Operating system: Cross-platform
- Platform: Java, XML
- Type: Content management system
- License: GNU Lesser General Public License
- Website: www.opencms.org
- Repository: github.com/alkacon/opencms-core

OpenCms is an open-source content management system written in Java. It is distributed by Alkacon Software under the LGPL license. OpenCms requires a JSP Servlet container such as Apache Tomcat.

It is a CMS application with a browser-based work environment, asset management, user management, workflow management, a WYSIWYG editor, internationalization support, content versioning, and many more features including proxying of requests to another endpoint.

OpenCms was launched in 1999, based on its closed-source predecessor MhtCms. The first open source version was released in 2000.

OpenCms is used or has been used by large organizations such as WIPO, the LGT Group, the University of Stuttgart, the Archdiocese of Cologne, and the Chicago Mercantile Exchange.

== User interface ==
The OpenCms user interface runs in a web browser, placing control elements directly on the web page that is edited. Content on a page can be modified by drag and drop. Text can be edited "inline" directly on the web page, or in an alternative form based editor.

Web pages and their navigation structure are managed in a dedicated sitemap editor. Content elements are stored in galleries and can be reused between different web pages or web sites. An additional "power user" interface for Administrators provides role and permission management. Since version 9.5 OpenCms has offered layout and template creation without coding.

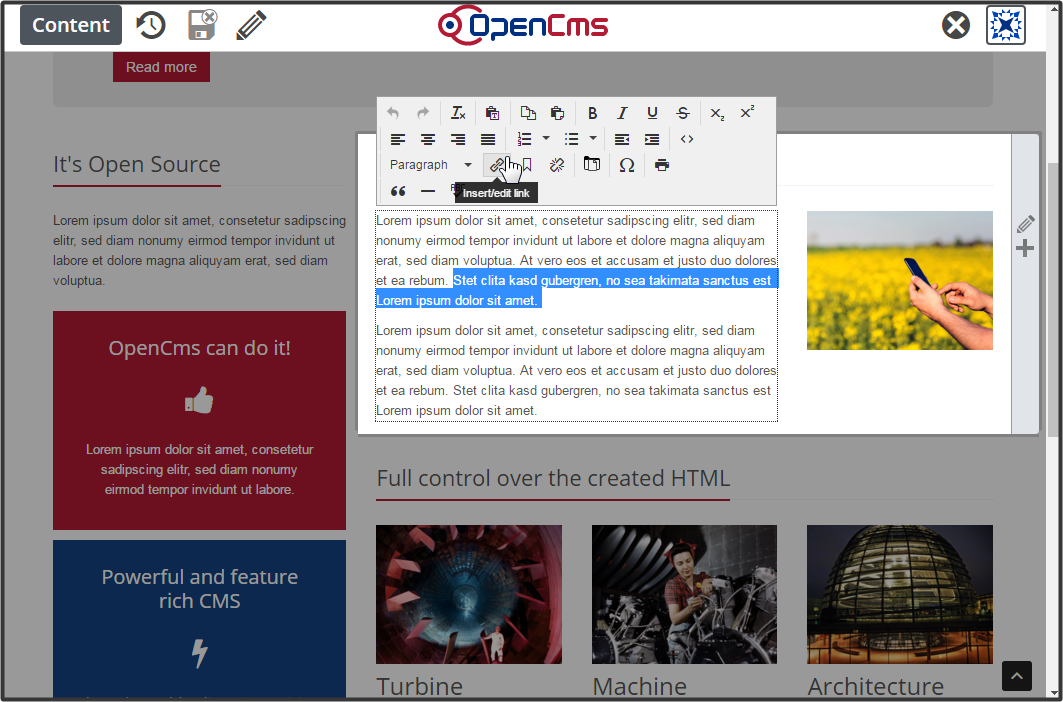
Editing a web page in the inline editor of OpenCms 10.

== Technology ==
OpenCms runs on the Java platform as a servlet. It uses several libraries provided by the Apache foundation. The user interface has been developed using Vaadin and the Google Web Toolkit.

The OpenCms content repository is stored in a database, with MariaDB, MySQL, PostgreSQL, HSQLDB, Oracle, MSSQL and IBM Db2 being natively supported. It can be accessed with CMIS, WebDAV as an SMB network share or through the native web interface.

Text content in OpenCms is defined using an XML schema. The user interface for the content managers creates XML files based on these schemas, which are stored in the database repository. A template system based on JavaServer Pages then creates web pages from the XML.

== Versions ==
OpenCms has been under continuous development as an open source project since the year 2000. Currently a major version is released every 6 months in April and October. The revision control of the OpenCms source code is done using Git on GitHub. The following table provides an overview of all major OpenCms releases.

Overview of major OpenCms releases
Version	Release date	Important new features
4.0	2 Feb 2000	Online / offline workflow, WYSIWYG editor for web pages, explorer, user management
5.0	5 May 2002	Page templates in JSP with own <cms:> tag library, extended caching and static export of pages
5.3	11 Dec 2003	Full text search using Lucene, direct edit of web pages
6.0	30 Jun 2005	Updated user interface, storage of content in XML files based on XSD, management of multiple sites
6.2	31 Mar 2006	Integrated image scaling, visual comparison of document versions
7.0	04 Jul 2007	Support for WebDAV, automatic link management, category tags for all content files
7.5	15 Jun 2009	Content galleries, extended support for creating JSP using expression language
8.0	8 May 2011	Enhanced user interface allowing drag and drop of elements in the page and sitemap editor, support for mobile devices
8.5	24 Sep 2012	"Inline" editing of web pages, integration of Apache Solr, CMIS support, SEO features
9.0	08 Nov 2013	Preview for mobile devices, accessing the content repository using a network share, visual site management interface, demo template based on Bootstrap
9.5	03 Nov 2014	Nested containers allow template and layout creation with drag and drop, user generated content, PDF creation, extended editor roles, spell checking in the WYSIWYG editor, visual management of galleries, categories and templates
10.0	23 Mar 2016	Modernized administration workplace, added Apollo Template, new file explorer, Identicons for users, direct commit of changed templates to Git, drag and drop of images, enhanced Solr based content search
10.5	15 Feb 2017	Improved localization tools for side-by-side comparison of sitemaps, support for generating pages as JSON fragments, asset connection for external data sources, font icons in the user interface
11.0	30 Apr 2019	Redesigned user interface, meta mappings for SEO, new Mercury Template, default content list generation with predefined Solr searches, bookmarks in the explorer, new apps for resource type and sessions management
12.0	12 Oct 2021	Headless JSON API for REST content access, greatly improved Mercury Template, template variants, updated WebDAV implementation.
13.0	03 Apr 2022	New plugin system, search by geo coordinates, extensions to template variants, improved Mercury template.
14.0	11 Oct 2022	XML schema versioning with automatic content rewrite, two factor authentication (2FA) in the user login, source code editor widget for multi-line text inputs, Mercury template updated to Bootstrap 5.2.
15.0	25 Apr 2023	Role-based control for sitemap access and new editor for modifying selected sitemap attributes, app "Person data search" reveals personal user data in the VFS, improved Mercury template.
16.0	02 Oct 2023	New app "Unused contents" finds and deletes content not actively used, individual detail pages based on categories, option to reset the password for all content managers, improved Mercury template.
17.0	09 Apr 2024	New app "Date search", export a selected site for archiving, hide "sensitive" content in the Offline project, support for Java LTS 17 and 21, improved Mercury template.
18.0	08 Oct 2024	New “Place element” mode in the page editor, markers for reused content, automatic typographical correction of quotation marks, improved Mercury template.
19.0	02 Apr 2025	New tools for website translation, image preview and filename validation in the upload dialog, improved content validation, fast access to categories.
20.0	14 Oct 2025	New "online-only" folders, link finisher, automatic folder disk space calculation, uploads with whitelists, styling for external links, seamless detail page moves.
21.0	14 Apr 2026	AI/LLM-based translation in the XML content editor, new secret provider securely stores encrypted passwords, upload dialog can edit properties for multiple files, supports Java 21 and 25.
Unsupported Supported Latest version Preview version

== See also ==
- List of content management systems
