= WebSphere Portal =

Enterprise software

- Original author: IBM
- Developer: HCL Technologies
- Initial release: 2001; 24 years ago
- Stable release: 9.0 / December 2016; 9 years ago
- Preview release: 9.0
- Written in: Java
- Type: Enterprise web portal software
- License: Proprietary
- Website: ibm.com/websphere/portal

WebSphere Portal is an enterprise software used to build and manage web portals. It provides access to web content and applications, while delivering personalized experiences for users.

The WebSphere Portal package is a component of WebSphere application software. Like WebSphere, WebSphere Portal was originally developed and marketed by IBM. Portal has been released since 2001, and is now sold in five editions. In July 2019, IBM completed the sale of WebSphere Portal (along with several other IBM products) to HCL Technologies.

WebSphere Portal software has been reviewed numerous times in the IT industry press, and honors include eWeek Magazine's 2004 Excellence Award in the category "Portals and Knowledge Management", Java Pro Magazine's 2003 Reader's Choice Award for "Best Team Development Tool", and the Software and Information Industry Association's 2003 Codie award for "Best Enterprise Portal Platform".

== Components ==
The WebSphere Portal package is available in five editions: WebSphere Portal Server, WebSphere Portal Enable, WebSphere Portal Enable for z/OS, WebSphere Portal Extend, and WebSphere Portal Express.

The basic package includes a web server, WebSphere Application Server, LDAP directory, IBM DB2 database, development tools, web site templates and other essential site management tools such as a configuration wizard. In addition, some editions of WebSphere Portal include limited entitlements to Lotus Web Content Management, Lotus Quickr document management, Lotus Sametime instant messaging, and Lotus Forms electronic forms. For WebSphere Portal Enable for z/OS, WebSphere Application Server and IBM DB2 database must be purchased separately.

IBM announced that WebSphere Portal package will be included in IBM Customer Experience Suite.

== Industry standards ==
The WebSphere Portal software suite adheres to industry standards: the Java Portlet Definition Standard (both JSR 168/v1 and JSR 286/v2 specifications) defined by the Java Community Process, as well as the Web Services for Remote Portlets (both WSRP 1.0 and 2.0) specifications defined by the Web Services for Remote Portlets OASIS Technical Committee.

The markup delivered to clients (i.e. to web browsers) adheres to the XHTML and CSS standards as defined by the World Wide Web Consortium (W3C). WebSphere Portal's JavaScript is ECMA-compliant.

== History ==
WebSphere Portal version	9.5	9.0	8.5	8.0	7.0	6.1.5	6.1	6.0	5.1	5.0	4.2	4.1	2.1	1.2
Release date	Sept 2019	December 2016	June 2014	May 2012	September 2010	December 2009	July 2008	February 2007	December 2003	August 2003	December 2002	May 2002	December 2001	July 2001

IBM first announced WebSphere Portal Server for AIX in 2001. Since then, IBM has released versions that run on Linux, Microsoft Windows, HP-UX, Solaris, IBM i, and z/OS.

In April 2006 version 6.0 was announced. The new features included Workflow (introduced a new workflow builder), Content Management (unveiled IBM Workplace Web Content Management Version 6.0, now IBM Web Content Management), Electronic Forms (incorporated IBM Workplace Forms, now IBM Lotus Forms) and Alignment with Bowstreet Portlet Factory (Now WebSphere Portlet Factory)

In March 2009, WebSphere Portal was at version 6.1 was announced, an upgrade that enhanced Web 2.0 capabilities, support for REST-based services, and improved Atom and RSS consumption. In November 2009, IBM then released WebSphere Portal Feature Pack Version 6.1.5, with new features that can be added to the version 6.1 platform, including new page builder and template capabilities, platform startup optimization, and expanded Enterprise Content Management (ECM) and Web analytics integration support.

In September 2010, WebSphere Portal version 7.0 was announced.

WebSphere Portal version 8.0 was released in May 2012. WebSphere Portal 8.5 was announced May 2014 and included enhancements for mobile web users as well as enhancements for Web Content Management (WCM).

In 2019, IBM announced that it was selling Websphere Portal, IBM Bigfix, IBM Appscan, IBM Unica, and IBM Websphere Commerce to HCL Technologies. HCL will continue to develop Websphere Portal.

== Current version ==
Continued leadership and development of important portal open standards, such as Java Specification Request (JSR) 286 and Web Services for Remote Portlets (WSRP) 2.0 standards.

IBM Lotus Web Content Management is better integrated, and IBM Lotus Web Content Management itself has large user interface and functionality improvements.

IBM WebSphere Portal and IBM Lotus Web Content Manager Version 8.0 enabled the 'Managed Pages' feature, whereby pages within the portal can be managed within IBM Lotus Web Content Management, allowing them to be syndicated between servers, as well as allowing workflow and versioning of the pages. IBM WebSphere Portal and IBM Lotus Web Content Manager Version 8.0.0.1 enables 'inline edit', which allows portal content to be directly edited in the portal page, rather than using the Web Content Manager Authoring Interface.
