= World Association of Professional Investigators =

The World Association of Professional Investigators (WAPI) is a professional association of private investigators (P.I's), private detectives and law enforcement agents founded in the UK in 2000.

== WAPI History ==
Private investigators Stuart R. Withers, John Edwards, John Hope, Jim Tozer, along with Ian D. Withers founded the World Association of Professional Investigators in 1999. The founder members convened their first formal meeting; and became a Governing Council in late 1999. Ian Withers became the first Chairman of the Association and Jim Tozer the first General Secretary. In early 2000, after the UK regulation of the industry was announced, WAPI was opened to the broader community of professional investigators as a representative body.(PIs).

== Statutory Inquiries ==
Ian D Withers (sitting on WAPI's governing council) gave verbal evidence to the Home Affairs Select Committee.

Tony Smith (sitting on WAPI's governing council) gave verbal evidence to the Leveson Inquiry on 2 February 2012. As of November 2012, Smith served as the chairman of WAPI.
