= Jahia =

Software company

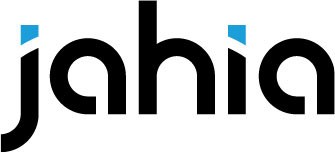
- Developer: Jahia Solutions Group
- Stable release: 8.2.0 / December 1, 2024
- Written in: Java
- Operating system: Cross-platform
- Type: Enterprise portal, content management framework, content management system, community
- License: GPLv3 and proprietary
- Website: jahia.com
- Repository: github.com/Jahia/jahia

Jahia is an international software company that develops web content management (CMS) and digital experience platform (DXP) solutions. Founded in 2002, Jahia offers a set of modular product intended to support organizations in creating, managing, and personalizing digital experiences across multiple channels.

Its platform combines content management, a customer data platform (CDP), and integrations with marketing tools. It is used for projects such as public websites, portals, mobile applications, and multilingual or multisite deployments. Jahia has adopted a hybrid approach that supports both headless and full-stack use cases, with an emphasis on interoperability and cloud deployment options.

The company is headquartered in Geneva, Switzerland, and also operates offices in Europe and North America. Its customers include organizations in financial services, telecommunications, higher education, and the public sector.

== Products ==
Products

- Jahia CMS – A hybrid content management system that supports both headless and traditional implementations.
- Jahia DXP – A digital experience solution powered by Apache Unomi, designed to collect first-party data, segment audiences, and deliver personalized experiences across channels.
- Jahia CDP – An open-source, headless Customer Data Platform (CDP) based on Apache Unomi.

According to a 2019 company release, Jahia's platform includes more than 1000 prebuilt connectors for integration with third-party systems.

Architecture

- Developed in Java.
- Designed with an API-first principle to simplify integration with other systems.
- Supports a headless approach while offering a management interface for hybrid CMS use.
- Deployable in the cloud (public or private) or on-premises, depending on organizational needs.
- Includes privacy-by-design features through Apache Unomi, such as consent management and data anonymization .

== Origins and Identity ==
Jahia was founded in 2002 with the goal of offering a more flexible alternative to traditional content management systems. From the start, the company sought to unify web content management and customer data management within a single platform tailored to modern digital experience requirements.

Jahia remains a privately held, independent company headquartered in Geneva, with offices in France, Canada, and the United States. Its core expertise lies in developing CMS and DXP solutions with built-in CDP functionality. The platform delivers a "hybrid" model, supporting both headless implementations (without an imposed rendering interface) and traditional usage.

While based on open-source architecture, Jahia follows a mixed business model, combining open-source software with professional services.

== History ==
- 2002 – Jahia was founded in Geneva, Switzerland.
- 2015 – The company completed a €20 million (US$22.5 million) funding round with Invus.
- 2015 - Winner of the 2015 Red Herring Top 100 Europe Award
- 2018 – Jahia donated its CDP to The Apache Software Foundation.
- 2019 – Apache Unomi was recognized as a Top-Level Project by the Apache Software Foundation.
- 2019 – Jahia announced expansion in North America, a new website, and reported that all new contracts that year were cloud-based.
- 2021 – Jahia released a new version of Jahia DXP, described as enabling personalization on any CMS through Apache Unomi.
