= Workflow APIs and interchange formats =

WAPI is an abbreviation for workflow APIs and interchange formats, published by the Workflow Management Coalition, and incorporating specifications to enable interoperability between different components of workflow management systems and applications.

WAPI includes:

- A range of API calls to support functions between a workflow engine and applications or other system components
- Interchange formats and protocols to support interoperability between different workflow engines
- Formats for the exchange of information such as process definitions and audit data between a workflow engine and other external repositories.

== Synonyms ==
- Workflow APIs
- Workflow management system APIs
