= Enterprise portal =

Information integration framework

An enterprise portal, also known as an enterprise information portal (EIP), is a framework for integrating information, people and processes across organizational boundaries in a manner similar to the more general web portals. Enterprise portals provide a secure unified access point, often in the form of a web-based user interface, and are designed to aggregate and personalize information through application-specific portlets.

One hallmark of enterprise portals is the de-centralized content contribution and content management, which keeps the information always updated. Another distinguishing characteristic is that they cater for customers, vendors and others beyond an organization's boundaries. This contrasts with a corporate portal which is structured for roles within an organization.

== History ==
The mid-1990s saw the advent of public web portals. These sites provided a key set of features (e.g., news, e-mail, weather, stock quotes, and search) that were often presented in self-contained boxes or portlets. Before long, enterprises of all sizes began to see a need for a similar starting place for their variety of internal repositories and applications, many of which were migrating to Web-based technologies.

By the late 1990s, software vendors began to produce prepackaged enterprise portals. These software packages would be toolkits for enterprises to quickly develop and deploy their own customized enterprise portal. The first commercial portal software vendor began to appear in 1998. By 2002, competing product offerings from application server vendors entered the market. In 2003, vendors of Java-based enterprise portals produced a standard known as JSR-168. It was to specify an API for interoperability between enterprise portals and portlets. Software vendors began producing JSR-168 compliant portlets that can be deployed onto any JSR-168 compliant enterprise portal. The second iteration of the standard, JSR-286, was final-released on 12 June 2008. Enterprises may choose to develop multiple enterprise portals based on business structure and strategic focus while reusing architectural frameworks, component libraries, or standardized project methods (e.g. B2E, B2C, B2B, B2G, etc.).

== Employee portal ==
A study conducted in 2006 by Forrester Research, Inc. showed that 46 percent of large companies used a portal referred to as an employee portal. Employee portals can be described as a specific set of enterprise portals and are used to give an interface for employees to personalized information, resources, applications, and e-commerce options.

== Lean portal ==
In 2009, Gartner introduced the concept of the portal-less portal or the "lean portal". Lean portals offer an alternative to the traditional portals available for the last 15 years, which have become very difficult to deploy and maintain. Traditional portals are bloated with features that aren't necessarily cost-effective to businesses. This leads to a lot of frustration for companies thinking of investing in a portal as the traditional model forces them to exceed their budgets for features they don't want or need, without being able to deliver the results they wanted. In contrast, a lean portal is lightweight and easy to deploy. It's built using modern Web 2.0 technologies, such as AJAX, widgets, representational state transfer (REST) and WOA/SOA approaches. According to Gartner, organizations who opted for a lean portal found that it delivered more than 80% of the required functionality within months of launching, without compromising security or advanced integration requirements.

== Fundamental features ==
An enterprise portal has two main functions; integration and presentation. It must be able to access information from multiple and varied sources and manipulate that information through the portal.

Other common features include;

- Single sign-on — enterprise portals can provide single sign-on capabilities between their users and various other systems. This requires a user to authenticate only once.
- Integration — the connection of functions and data from multiple systems into new components/portlets/web parts with an integrated navigation between these components.
- Federation — the integration of content provided by other portals, typically through the use of WSRP or similar technologies.
- Customization — Users can customize the look and feel of their environment. Customers who are using EIPs can edit and design their own web sites which are full of their own personality and own style; they can also choose the specific content and services they prefer. Also refers to the ability to prioritize most appropriate content based on attributes of the user and metadata of the available content.
- Personalization — Personalization is more about matching content with the user. Based on a user profile, personalization uses rules to match the "services", or content, to the specific user. To some degree, you can think of the two like this: customization is in hands of the end user, personalization is not. Of course actual personalization is often based on your role or job function within the portal context.
- Access control — the ability for portal to limit specific types of content and services users have access to. For example, a company's proprietary information can be entitled for only company employee access. This access rights may be provided by a portal administrator or by a provisioning process. Access control lists manage the mapping between portal content and services over the portal user base.
- Enterprise search — search enterprise content using enterprise search.
- Omni channel enablement — present the pages optimally on all channels and devices.
- Analytics — track and monitor user behaviour on portal pages (such as navigation, clicks, downloads, page exits and such) and generate reports.

== Marketplace ==
In 2014, independent analyst firm Real Story Group divided the Enterprise Portals technology marketplace into two categories: Infrastructure and Specialist vendors. The two categories include ten vendors that the firm evaluates in its Enterprise Portals Report.

== Common applications ==
- Content management system
- Document management system
- Collaboration software
- Business process management systems
- Customer relationship management
- Business intelligence
- Intranet
- Wiki
- Blog
- RSS
- Knowledge management system

== See also ==
- List of enterprise portal vendors
- Intranet portal
- Intranet
