= Digital asset management =

Cloud management system

Digital asset management (DAM) and the implementation of its use as a computer application is required in the collection of digital assets to ensure that the owner, and possibly their delegates, can perform operations on the data files.

== Terminology ==
The term media asset management (MAM) may be used in reference to Digital Asset Management when applied to the sub-set of digital objects commonly considered "media", namely audio recordings, photos, and videos. Any editing process that involves media, especially video, can make use of a MAM to access media components to be edited together or combined with a live feed in a fluent manner. A MAM typically offers at least one searchable index of the images, audio, and videos it contains, constructed from metadata harvested from the images using pattern recognition, or input manually.

Digital asset management (DAM) may focus on the electronic management of any form of a digitally stored piece of information. DAM is certainly strategic, while MAM is almost always tactical. Both asset management primarily reflect long-term stored content that is used for archiving, preservation, and most notably reuse.

== Difference between a Digital Asset Manager and repositories ==
The difference between the Digital Asset Management solution and storage repositories lies in how each handles digital documents: while the DAM is business and governance-oriented giving the file meaning within the corporation repositories such as Google Drive, SharePoint, and OneDrive are simple storage structures lacking any business context aligned with operational needs.

== Management ==
=== Creation ===
Applications implement Digital Asset Management (DAM) by importing it from the analog and/or digital domains (by encoding, scanning, optical character recognition, etc.) or by authoring it as a new object.

=== Indexing ===
A primary function of a DAM system is to make assets easily available to its users by providing a searchable index that supports retrieval of assets by their content and metadata. The cataloging function is usually part of the ingestion process for new assets.

=== Workflow ===
Digital assets will typically have a lifecycle, which may include various states such as creation, approval, live, archived, and deleted. Transitions between these states can trigger automated notifications or route assets to the appropriate team for review.

=== Version control ===
Often a DAM system will store earlier versions of a digital asset and allow those to be downloaded or reverted to. Therefore, a DAM system can operate as an advanced type of version control system.

=== Access control ===
Finally, a DAM system typically includes security controls ensuring relevant people have access to assets. This will often involve integration with existing directory services via a technology such as single sign-on.

== Categorization ==
Smaller DAM systems are used in a particular operational context, for instance, in video production systems. The key differentiators between them are the types of input encoders used for creating digital copies of assets to bring them under management, and the output decoders and/or formatters used to make them usable as documents and/or online resources. The metadata of a content item can serve as a guide to the selection of the codec(s) needed to handle the content during processing and may be of use when applying access control rules to enforce authorization policy.

=== Requirements ===
Assets that require specific technologies to be used in a workflow need to have their bandwidth, latency, and access control requirements considered in the design of the tools that create or store them, as well as in the architecture of the system that distributes and archives them. When assets are not actively being worked on, they can be stored in a DAM in various formats, including as a blob (binary large object in a database) or as a file in a standard file system, which is "cheaper" to store than the form needed during operations on them. This allows the implementation of large-scale DAM as an assembly of high-performance processing systems within a network with a high-density storage solution at its center.

== Types of systems ==
Digital asset management systems fall into the following classifications:

- Brand management system: Enforce brand presentation within an organization by making approved logos, fonts, and product images easily accessible.
- Library or archive: Provide bulk storage of infrequently changing video or photo assets.
- Media asset management systems: Handling assets in the audiovisual domain including audio, video, or still images.
- Production management systems: Manage assets being created on the fly for use in live media production or as visual effects for use in gaming applications, TV, or films.
- Streaming: Facilitate on-demand delivery of digital content, like TV shows or movies, to end users on behalf of digital retailers.
- 3D digital asset management systems: These systems are specialized for the organization, storage, and delivery of 3D content, such as digital twins, LiDAR scans, AR/VR assets, and gaming models. 3D DAMs typically include tools for 3D model optimization (decimation), texture handling, and conversion between proprietary and open formats (e.g., glTF, USDZ, FBX).

All of these types will include features for workflow management, collaboration, project management, and revision control.

== Media asset issues ==
An asset can exist in several formats and in a sequence of versions. The digital version of the original asset is generally captured in as high resolution, colour depth, and (if applicable) frame rate as needed to ensure that results are of acceptable quality for the end-use. There can also be thumbnail copies of lower quality for use in visual indexing.

Metadata for an asset can include its packaging, encoding, provenance, ownership and access rights, and location of original creation. It is used to provide hints to the tools and systems used to work on, or with, the asset about how it should be handled and displayed.

As digital ecosystems expand into the metaverse and spatial computing, asset management issues have grown to include 3D asset complexities. Unlike standard 2D images or video, 3D assets often require management of complex file interdependencies (such as textures and materials linked to geometry) and significant file optimization to ensure performance on mobile or web-based AR viewers. 3D-first DAM solutions address these issues by automating the conversion and compression processes required to display high-fidelity models across different devices and engines (e.g., Unity, Unreal Engine, WebXR).

== See also ==
- Content management
- Digital asset
- Digital library
- Digital preservation
- Digital rights management
- Image organizer, possible presentation layer for a DAM
- Web content management system, may be a presentation layer for a DAM
- Enterprise content management
