= Enterprise content management =

Implementation of information technology management

Enterprise content management (ECM) extends the concept of content management by adding a timeline for each content item and, possibly, enforcing processes for its creation, approval, and distribution. Systems using ECM generally provide a secure repository for managed items, analog or digital. They also include one (or more) methods for importing content to manage new items, and several presentation methods to make items available for use. Although ECM content may be protected by digital rights management (DRM), it is not required. ECM is distinguished from general content management by its cognizance of the processes and procedures of the enterprise for which it is created.

== Definitions ==
- Late 2005: The technology was used to capture, manage, store, preserve, and deliver content and documents related to organizational processes
- Early 2006: ECM tools and strategies allowed the management of an organization's unstructured information, wherever that information exists.
- Early 2008: The strategies, methods, and tools were used to capture, manage, store, preserve, and deliver content and documents related to organizational processes. ECM tools and strategies allowed the management of an organization's unstructured information, wherever that information exists
- Early 2010: The strategies, methods, and tools were used to capture, manage, store, preserve, and deliver content and documents related to organizational processes. ECM covered the management of information within the entire scope of an enterprise whether that information is in the form of a paper document, an electronic file, a database print stream, or even an email
- March 2017: The Association for Information and Image Management (AIIM) proposed replacing "enterprise content management" with "intelligent information management". IIM is defined as "the strategies, methods, and tools used to create, capture, automate, deliver, secure, and analyze content and documents related to organizational processes. IIM refers to the management of content AND data, not just content itself."

The latest definition encompasses areas which have traditionally been addressed by records- and document-management systems. It implies the conversion of data to digital and traditional forms, including paper and microfilm.

ECM, as an umbrella term, covers document and web content management, search, collaboration, records management, digital asset management (DAM), workflow management, and capture and scanning. It manages the life cycle of information, from initial publication (or creation) through archival and eventual disposal. It is delivered in four ways:

- On-premises software (installed on an organization's network)
- Software as a service (SaaS): Web access to information stored on a software manufacturer's system
- A hybrid of both on-premises and SaaS components
- Infrastructure as a Service (IaaS): Online services which abstract the user from infrastructure details like physical computing resources, location, data partitioning, scaling, security, and backup

Benefits to an organization include improved efficiency, better control, and reduced costs. Banks have converted to storing copies of old cheques in ECM systems from the older method of keeping physical cheques in warehouses. Under the old system, a customer request for a copy of a cheque might take weeks; a bank employee had to contact the warehouse where the right box, file and cheque were located. The cheque would be pulled and a copy made and mailed to the bank, which would then mail it to the customer. With an ECM system in place, a bank employee could query the system for the customer's account number and the number of the requested cheque. When an image of the cheque appeared on-screen, the bank could mail a copy immediately to the customer; usually while the customer was still on the phone.

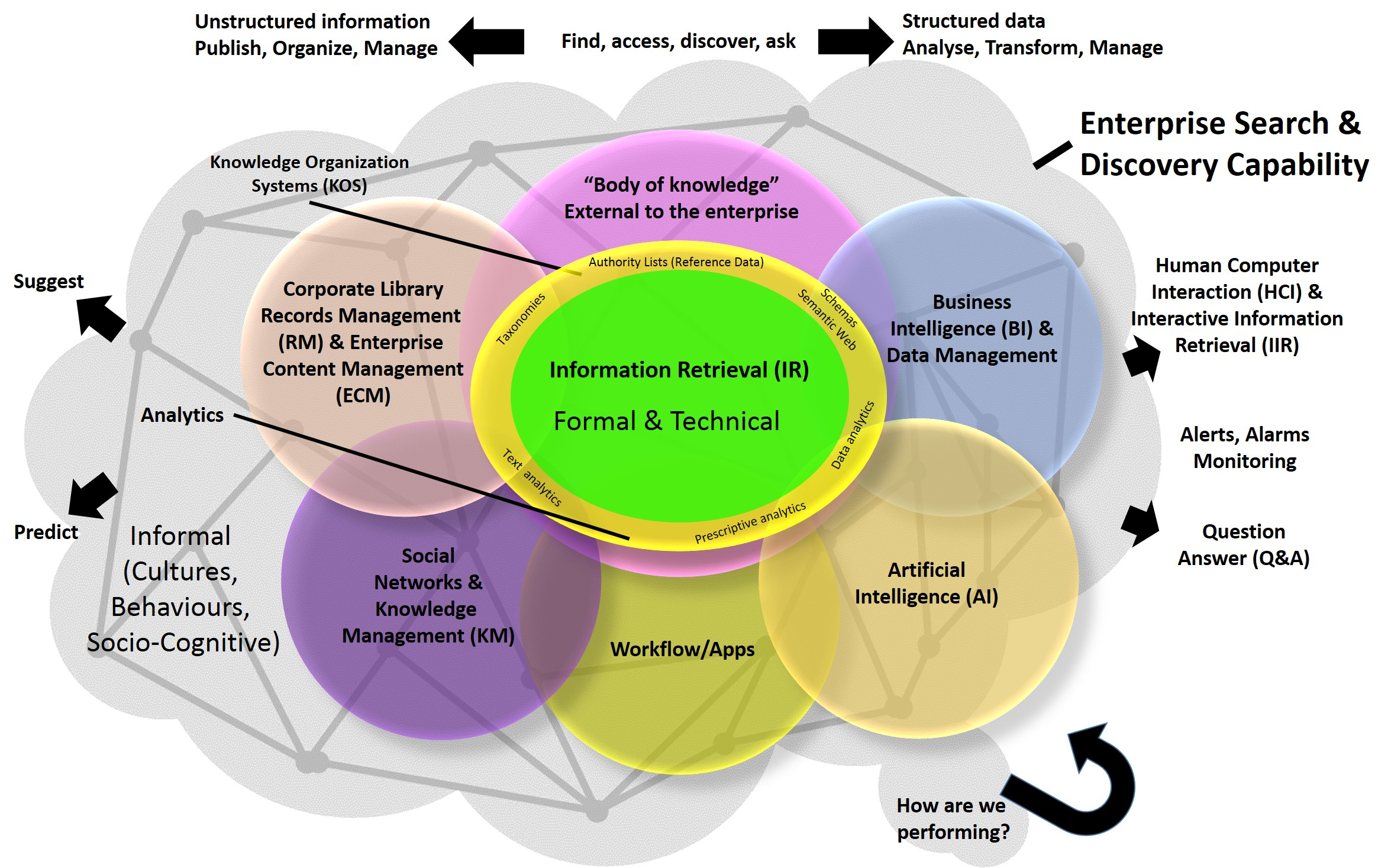
Corporate Brain Graphic

== Scope ==
Enterprise content management, a form of content management, combines the capture, search and networking of documents with digital archiving, document management and workflow. It includes the challenges involved in using and preserving a company's internal (often unstructured) information in all of its forms. Most ECM solutions focus on business-to-employee (B2E) systems.

New ECM components have emerged. As content is checked in and out, each use generates new metadata (automatically, to some extent). Information about how (and when) people use the content can allow the system to acquire new filtering, routing and search pathways, corporate taxonomies and semantic networks, and retention-rule decisions.

Solutions can provide intranet services to employees (B2E), and can include enterprise portals for business-to-business (B2B), business-to-government (B2G), government-to-business (G2B), or other business relationships. This category includes most former document-management groupware and workflow solutions that had not, by 2016, fully converted their architecture to ECM but provided a web interface. Digital asset management is a form of ECM involving digitally-stored content. Specialized Healthcare Content Management Systems meet the special regulatory requirements for medical devices and interoperability.

ECM is increasingly positioned as a collaborative and integrative platform that transcends traditional organisational boundaries. By supporting interoperability across systems and stakeholders, ECM facilitates seamless information exchange in complex environments such as public–private partnerships, government services, and global supply chains. This reinforces its role not only as a repository of organisational memory but as an active infrastructure underpinning digital ecosystems and networked forms of governance.

== History ==
The technologies which encompassed ECM in 2016 descend from the electronic Document Management Systems (DMS) of the late 1980s and early 1990s. The original DMS products were stand-alone, providing functionality in one of four areas: imaging, workflow, document management, and enterprise relationship management (ERM).

A typical early DMS user had a small-scale imaging and workflow system (perhaps one department) to improve a paper-intensive process and work towards a paperless office. The first stand-alone DMS technologies intended to save time (or improve information access) by reducing paper handling and storage, reducing document loss and speeding access to information. DMS could provide online access to information formerly available only on paper, microfilm, or microfiche. By improving control over documents and their processes, DMS streamlined business practices. Their audit trail increased document security and measured productivity and efficiency.

DMS product categories were seen as complementary, and organizations wished to use several DMS products. A customer-service department could combine imaging, document management and workflow; an accounting department could access supplier invoices from an ERM system, purchase orders from an imaging system, and contracts from a document-management system. As organizations established an Internet presence, they wanted to manage web content. Organizations which had automated individual departments began to envision a broader deployment.

The movement toward integrated DMS systems reflected a common trend in the software industry: the integration of small systems into more comprehensive ones. Word processing, spreadsheet, and presentation software were standalone products until the early 1990s, when the market shifted toward integration.

Early developers offered multiple stand-alone DMS technologies as a single, packaged "suite", with little (or no) functional integration. Around 2001, the industry began to use the term "enterprise content management" for integrated systems.

In 2006, Microsoft (with its SharePoint product family) and Oracle Corporation (with Oracle Content Management) entered the low-cost ECM market. (Note: Microsoft launched its ECM strategy with MOSS 2007; Oracle with Oracle 10g and the acquisition of Stellent, both in late 2006.) Open source ECM products are also available.

Government standards, including the Health Insurance Portability and Accountability Act (HIPAA), BS 7799 and ISO/IEC 27001, influence the development and use of ECM. In 2016, organizations could deploy a single ECM system to manage information in all departments.

== Uses ==
Businesses adopt ECM to increase efficiency, improve information control, and reduce the overall cost of information management. ECM streamlines access to records with keyword and full-text searching, allowing employees to quickly obtain needed information from their desktops.

ECM facilitates organizational efficiency through the following capabilities:

- Data/Document Capture – Capture, digitize, and index documents and data at their ingestion point, whether via email, invoice, paper form, or other.
- Secure Content Repository – Hold documents and data in a central access point for easy retrieval, use, and version control.
- Assign security and compliance controls — Protect sensitive data with user-assigned access controls and retention policy procedures.
- Automated workflow delivery – Keep processes moving with automated approvals and document/data routing to workflow touchpoints.

The management systems can help businesses comply with government and industry regulations such as HIPAA, the Sarbanes–Oxley Act, the Payment Card Industry Data Security Standard (PCI DSS), and the Federal Rules of Civil Procedure. Security at the user, function, and record levels protect sensitive data. Some information in a document can be redacted, so the remainder can be shared without compromising identity or key data. Every action in the system is tracked, and can be reported to demonstrate compliance with a wide variety of regulations.

== Characteristics ==
ECM is distinguished from general content management by its cognizance of the processes and procedures of the enterprise for which it is created. In his article “ECM – Ruler of Information”, Ulrich Kampffmeyer characterised ECM in 2001 as:

1. ECM functions as integrative infrastructure, connecting previously siloed vertical applications and making content accessible across the enterprise. Enterprise application integration (EAI) and service-oriented architecture (SOA) underpin this connectivity.
2. ECM exposes its capabilities as independent services, meaning individual components such as capture, workflow, or records management can be consumed by different applications without duplicating functionality.
3. ECM provides a uniform repository, consolidating documents, data, and digital assets into a single managed store, eliminating costly redundancies and improving information consistency across the organisation.

Artificial intelligence has extended these three properties in modern ECM platforms. At the infrastructure layer, AI enables intelligent routing and classification of content as it moves between systems without manual intervention. Within the services layer, AI-powered capabilities such as optical character recognition, named entity extraction, and large language model-based summarisation are now exposed as discrete services that applications can call on demand. At the repository level, AI assists with automated metadata generation, duplicate detection, and retention policy enforcement, tasks that previously required significant manual configuration.

== Components ==
ECM combines components which can be used as stand-alone systems without being incorporated into an enterprise-wide system. The five ECM components were defined by the Association for Information and Image Management (AIIM) as:

- Capture
- Manage
- Store
- Preserve
- Deliver

=== Capture ===
Capture involves converting information from paper documents into an electronic format by scanning, and collects electronic files and information into a consistent structure for management. Capture technologies also encompass the creation of metadata, describing characteristics of a document for easy location through search technology. A medical chart might include the patient ID, name, date of visit and procedure for medical personnel to locate the chart.

Earlier document automation systems photographed documents for storage on microfilm or microfiche. Image scanners make digital copies of paper documents. Documents already in digital form can be copied (or linked to) if they are available online. Automatic or semi-automatic capture can use electronic data interchange (EDI) or XML documents, business and ERP applications, or specialized-application systems as sources.

==== Recognition technologies ====
Recognition technologies to extract information from scanned documents and digital faxes include:

- Optical character recognition (OCR): Converts images of typeset text into alphanumeric characters
- Handwriting recognition (HWR): Converts images of handwritten text into alphanumerics
- Intelligent character recognition (ICR): Extends OCR and HWR to use comparison, logical connections, and checks against reference lists and existing data to improve recognition
- Optical mark recognition (OMR): Reads special markings (such as check marks or dots) in predefined fields
- Barcode recognition: Decodes industry-standard encodings of product and other commercial data

==== Image cleanup ====
Image-cleanup features include rotation, straightening, color adjustment, transposition, zoom, aligning, page separation, annotations and noise reduction.

==== Forms processing ====
Forms processing has two groups of technology, although the information content and character of the documents may be identical. It is the capture of printed forms via scanning; recognition technologies are often used, since well-designed forms enable automatic processing. Automatic processing can capture electronic forms (such as those submitted via webpages) if the layout, structure, logic, and contents are known to the capturing system.

==== Enterprise report management ====
Enterprise report management (ERM) records reports and other documents on optical disks or other digital storage for ECM systems. The technology was originally used with laserDiscs.

==== Data aggregation ====
Data aggregation unifies documents from different applications and sources, forwarding them to storage and processing systems in a uniform structure and format.

==== Subject indexing ====
Subject indexing improves searches, providing alternative ways of organizing information. Manual indexing assigns index database attributes to content by hand, and is typically used by a "manage" database for administration and access.

Automatic and manual attribute indexing can be facilitated with preset input-design profiles, which can describe document classes that limit the number of possible index values or automatically assign certain criteria. Automatic classification programs can extract index, category, and transfer data autonomously. Based on the information contained in electronic information objects, it can evaluate information based on predefined criteria or in a self-learning process.

=== Manage ===
The manage category has five application areas:

- Document management (DMS)
- Collaborative software
- Web content management, including web portals
- Records management
- Workflow and business process management (BPM)

It connects the other components, which can be used in combination or separately. Document management, web content management, collaboration, workflow and business process management address the dynamic part of the information's life cycle. Records management manages finalized documents in accordance with the organization's retention period, which must comply with government mandates and industry practices. Manage components incorporate databases and access-authorization systems.

==== Document management ====
Document management systems control documents from creation to archiving. They include:

- Check in-check out: Checks stored information for consistency
- Version management: Keeps track of different versions of the same information, with revisions and different formats
- Search and navigation: Finds information and its associated contexts
- Organizing documents in files, folders, and overviews

Document management overlaps with other manage components, office applications (like Microsoft Outlook and Exchange, or Lotus Notes and Domino), and library services which administer information storage.

==== Collaboration ====
Collaboration components in an ECM system help users work together to develop and process content. Many of these components were developed from collaborative-software packages; ECM collaborative systems include elements of knowledge management.

They use information databases and processing methods which are designed to be used simultaneously by a number of users on the same content item. Collaboration uses skill-based knowledge, resources and background data for joint information processing. Administration components (such as virtual whiteboards for brainstorming, appointment scheduling, and project management systems) and communications applications such as video conferencing may be included. Collaborative ECM may also integrate information from other applications.

==== Web content management ====
ECM integrates Content management systems (CMS), presenting existing information managed in the ECM repository.

==== File and archive management ====
Unlike traditional electronic archival systems, file and archive management is the administration of records, important information, and data which companies are required to archive. Independent of storage media, managed information does not need to be stored electronically. File and archive management includes:

- Visualization of file plans and other structured indexes for the orderly storage of information
- Unambiguous indexing of information, supported by thesauruses or controlled word lists
- Management of record-retention and deletion schedules
- Protection of information in accordance with its characteristics
- International, industry-specific (or company-wide), standardized metadata for the unambiguous identification and description of stored information

==== Workflow and business process management ====
The terms "workflow" and "business process management" (BPM) are often used interchangeably. Production workflow uses predefined sequences to control processes; in an ad-hoc workflow, the user determines the process sequence. Users interact in workflow solutions, and workflow engines are a background service controlling information and data flow. Workflow management includes:

- Visualization of process and organization structures
- Capture, administration, visualization, and delivery of information with its associated documents or data
- Incorporation of data-processing tools (such as applications) and documents, such as office products
- Parallel and sequential processing of procedures, including simultaneous saving
- Reminders, deadlines, delegation and other administrative functions
- Monitoring and documentation of process status, routing, and outcomes
- Tools to design and display process

According to the AIIM, BPM is a way of looking at (and controlling) organizational processes.

=== Store ===
Store components temporarily store information which is not required, desired, or ready for long-term storage or preservation. Even if the store component uses media suitable for long-term archiving, it is still separate from "preserve."

Store components may be divided into three categories:

- Repositories: storage locations
- Library services: administration components for repositories
- Storage technologies

==== Repositories ====
ECM repositories may be combined. Types include:

- File systems: Used primarily for temporary storage, as input and output caches
- Content management systems: Storage and repository systems for content; may be a database or a specialized storage system
- Databases administer information, and can also store documents, content, or media.
- Data warehouses: Complex storage systems based on databases, which provide information from a variety of sources. They may be designed with global functions, such as documents or information.

==== Library services ====
Library services are ECM administrative components which handle access to information, taking in and storing information from the capture and manage components. They also manage the storage locations in dynamic storage, the store, and the long-term preserve archive. The storage location is determined by information characteristics and classification. The library service works with the manage components' database to provide search and retrieval.

It manages online storage (direct access to data and documents), nearline storage (data and documents on a medium which can be accessed quickly, such as data on an optical disc in a storage system's racks but not inserted in a drive that can read it), and offline storage (data and documents on a medium which is not quickly available).

If the document management system does not provide it, the library service must have version management to control the status of information and check-in/check-out for controlled information provision. It generates an audit trail, logs of information usage and editing.

==== Storage technologies ====
A variety of technologies can be used to store information, depending on the application and system environment:

- Magnetic online media: Hard disk drives (typically configured as RAID systems) may be locally attached, part of a storage area network, or mounted from another server (network-attached storage).
- Magnetic tape: Magnetic tape data storage, in the form of tape libraries, use robotics to provide nearline storage. Standalone tape drives may be used for backup.
- Digital optical media: In addition to compact disc and DVD optical media, storage systems may use magneto-optical drives; optical jukeboxes can be used for nearline storage. Optical media in jukeboxes may be moved offline.
- Cloud computing: Data may be accessed via the Internet.

=== Preserve ===
Preserve is the long-term, safe storage and backup of unchanging information. Typically accomplished by ECM records management, it may be designed to help companies comply with government and industry regulations.

Content eventually stops changing and becomes static. ECM's digital preservation components also temporarily store information which does not need to be archived. Preserve components have special viewers, conversion and migration tools, and long-term storage media:

- Write once read many (WORM) 5.25-inch (13.3 cm) or 3.5-inch (89 mm) optical discs, CD-Rs and DVD-Rs
- Magnetic tapes in secure drives
- Content-addressable storage, with software protection against overwriting, erasure, and editing
- Storage networks may be used if they provide edit-proof auditing, with unchangeable storage and protection against manipulation and erasure.
- Microforms, such as microfilm, microfiche, and aperture cards, are typically used to secure electronic information.
- Paper also secures electronic information.

==== Long-term preservation strategies ====
To ensure the long term availability of information, several strategies are used for electronic archiving. Applications, index data, metadata and objects may be continuously migrated from older systems to newer ones. Emulation of older software allows users to access original data and objects; software can identify the format of preserved objects and display them in a new environment.

=== Deliver ===
Enterprise output management presents information from the manage, store, and preserve components. Its Association for Information and Image Management model for ECM is function-based; the deliver components may enter information into other systems (such as transferring information to portable media or generating output files) or prepare information for storage and preservation.

Deliver components may be divided into three groups: transformation technologies, security technologies, and distribution. Transformation and security are middleware services and should be equally available to all ECM components. For output, primary functions are layout and design (with tools for laying out and formatting output) and electronic publishing (presenting information for distribution).

==== Transformation technologies ====
Transformations should be controlled and trackable by background services. They include:

- Computer output to laser disc (COLD): When used for delivery COLD prepares output data for distribution and archiving. Applications include lists and formatted output (such as personalized customer letters), journals and logs.
- Personalization: Functions and output customized for a user's needs
- XML (Extensible Markup Language): Enables the standardized, cross-platform description of interfaces, structures, metadata, and documents
- PDF (Portable Document Format): A cross-platform printing and distribution format which permits content searches, the addition of metadata, and the embedding of electronic signatures. When generated from electronic data, PDFs are resolution-independent and allow crisp reproduction at any scale.
- Open XML Paper Specification (OpenXPS): An XML specification, developed by Microsoft, describing the formats and rules for distributing, archiving, rendering, and processing XPS documents.
- Converters and viewers: Generates uniform formats to display (and output) information in different formats.
- Data compression: Reduces the storage space needed for pictorial information.
- Web syndication: Presents content in different formats, selections, and forms for multiple use in different forms for different purposes.

==== Security technologies ====
Security technologies are available for all ECM components. Electronic signatures are used when documents are sent and in scanning, to document full capture. Public key infrastructure is a basic electronic-signature technology, managing keys and certificates and checking signature authenticity. Other electronic signatures confirm the identity of the sender and the integrity of the sent data.

Digital rights management and watermarking are used in content syndication and media asset management to manage and secure intellectual property rights and copyrights. Electronic watermarks, embedded in a file, protect use rights for Internet content.

==== Distribution ====
ECM is provided to users with a variety of output and distribution media:

- Internet
  - Extranets
  - Intranets
  - Electronic business portals
  - Employee portals
- Email
- Fax
- Data transfer in EDI, XML or other formats
- Mobile devices, such as mobile phones and personal digital assistants
- Data media, such as CDs and DVDs
- Digital television and other multimedia services
- Paper

== Methods ==
=== On-premises ===
ECM was developed as a software application which companies implemented on corporate networks; each company manages and maintains the ECM and the network devices storing the data. On-premises ECM systems may be customized for organizational needs. Since paper-document capture requires devices such as image scanners or multi-function devices, it is typically performed on-premises; however, it may be outsourced to service bureaus for high-volume scanning, indexing and return via web transfer or on CDs, DVDs or other external storage devices.

=== Software as a service (SaaS) ===
Software as a service ECM, also known as cloud computing, is user-accessible online on demand.

== Market development ==
Before 2003, the ECM market was dominated by medium-sized independent vendors which fell into two categories: those who originated as document-management companies and began adding the management of other business content, and those who started as web content management providers and who tried to branch out into managing business documents and rich media.

In 2002, Documentum added collaboration capabilities with its acquisition of eRoom; Interwoven and Vignette countered with their acquisitions of iManage and Intraspect. Documentum purchased Bulldog for its digital asset management (DAM) capabilities; Interwoven and OpenText countered with acquisitions of MediaBin and Artesia. OpenText also acquired the European software companies IXOS and Red Dot. In October 2003, EMC Corporation acquired Documentum. IBM purchased FileNet and Oracle purchased Stellent in 2006; OpenText also purchased Hummingbird Ltd. that year. Hewlett-Packard (HP) acquired the Australian company Tower Software in 2008. In March 2009, Autonomy purchased Interwoven; OpenText acquired Vignette in July of that year and MetaStorm in February 2011. OpenText acquired Global 360 in July 2011, and HP agreed to purchase Autonomy in August 2011.

In April 2007, CMS Watch principal Alan Pelz-Sharpe said: "Some of the biggest names in this business are undergoing substantial transformation that will lead to shifting road maps and product sets over the next few years". Nuxeo and Alfresco offered open-source ECM software that year.

Gartner estimated in 2010 that the ECM market was worth approximately $3.5 billion in 2009; this was expected to grow at a compound annual growth rate of 10.1 percent through 2014. The market experienced a number of mergers and acquisitions in 2010. In 2014, Real Story Group (formerly CMS Watch) added cloud-based vendors to its 2014 ECM evaluations.

== See also ==
- Content Management Interoperability Services
- Content management system
- E-services
- Enterprise content integration
- Enterprise output management
- Information governance
- Information science
- List of content management systems
- Repository Open Service Interface Definition

== Bibliography ==
- Fray, Michael (2008). ECM - Enterprise Content Management (in Danish). Denmark: Forlaget Globe. ISBN 978-87-7900-831-1.
- Kampffmeyer, Ulrich (2006). ECM Enterprise Content Management (PDF). DMS EXPO 2006, Köln (in English, French, and German). Hamburg: PROJECT CONSULT. ISBN 978-3-936534-09-2. Archived from the original (PDF) on 2022-01-13.
