= Liferay =

American open-source software company

Liferay Inc.
- Company type: Private
- Industry: Software
- Founded: 2004
- Headquarters: Diamond Bar, California, United States
- Products: Liferay Portal; Liferay Commerce; Liferay Analytics Cloud; Liferay DXP Cloud
- Website: www.liferay.com/en/

Liferay, Inc., is an open-source company focused on enterprise portal technology. The company has its headquarters in Diamond Bar, California, United States.

== History ==
Liferay's original product, Liferay Portal, was created in 2000 by chief software architect Brian Chan to provide an enterprise portal service for non-profit organizations. In 2004, the company was incorporated under the name Liferay, Inc. and formalized its Germany subsidiary Liferay GmbH. In 2007, the company opened a new Asian headquarters in Dalian, China, and the Spanish subsidiary Liferay SL. In March 2009, the company opened a new office in Bangalore, India. To date Liferay has 22 offices worldwide with over 250 partners and 180,000 open source community members.

Sun Microsystems and Liferay signed a technology-sharing agreement during May 2008. Sun Microsystems rebranded the offering GlassFish Web Space Server. ZDNet further describes the relationship in the May 2008 article Sun and Liferay launch web-presentation platform. In 2010 Sun was acquired by Oracle and the GlassFish Web Space Server was not included in their portal roadmap, with all prospects turned over to Liferay, Inc.

In April 2013, Liferay partnered with TIBCO Software to offer a series of Liferay enterprise Connectivity Adapters (eC Adapters) that use TIBCO ActiveMatrix BusinessWorks with the intention of easing integration of Liferay Portal with multiple systems.

In May 2016, the company introduced Liferay Digital Experience Platform, an expansion of the original Liferay Portal, to offer additional functionality such as engagement metrics.

In July 2018, Liferay released two new products: a B2B focused digital commerce service called Liferay Commerce, and a cloud analytics software called Liferay Analytics Cloud.

In October 2018, Liferay DXP Cloud was released to help enterprise organizations move to the cloud.

In December 2019, collaborative editing of documents was fully introduced in Liferay with the integration of OnlyOffice editors via the integration app.

== See also ==
- List of enterprise portal vendors
