= Portlet =

Pluggable user-interface software component

A portlet is a pluggable user-interface software component that is displayed in a web portal (such as an enterprise portal or a web content management system). A collection of portlets produce fragments of markup (such as HTML, XHTML, or WML) that are presented as an integrated portal user experience.

A portlet container owns a collection of portlets. A container manages the life cycle of its portlets and provides a runtime environment with services such as persistent storage for user preferences. A container supports aggregating (integrating) information from different sources. Via user customization, a container supports a personalized portal user experience. A container with its portlets can form a web application. Portlet-based applications are often used for portals focused on news, weather, and Internet forums.

A portlet receives user agent requests as dispatched by the portal server and then the container. A portlet responds with dynamically generated content. Its container sends data to the portal for aggregation, but is not responsible for aggregating the content produced by the portlets. The portal itself handles aggregation. A portal and a portlet container can be built together as a single component of an application suite or as two separate components of a portal application.

Typically, a portlet technology is defined by a standard which enables software developers to create portlets that can be plugged into a portal conforming to the standard. An example is the Java Portlet Specification.

== See also ==
- Applet – Small software application
- Software widget – Part of a larger software application which has a stand-alone UI and simplified features
