= Bloomreach =

American software company

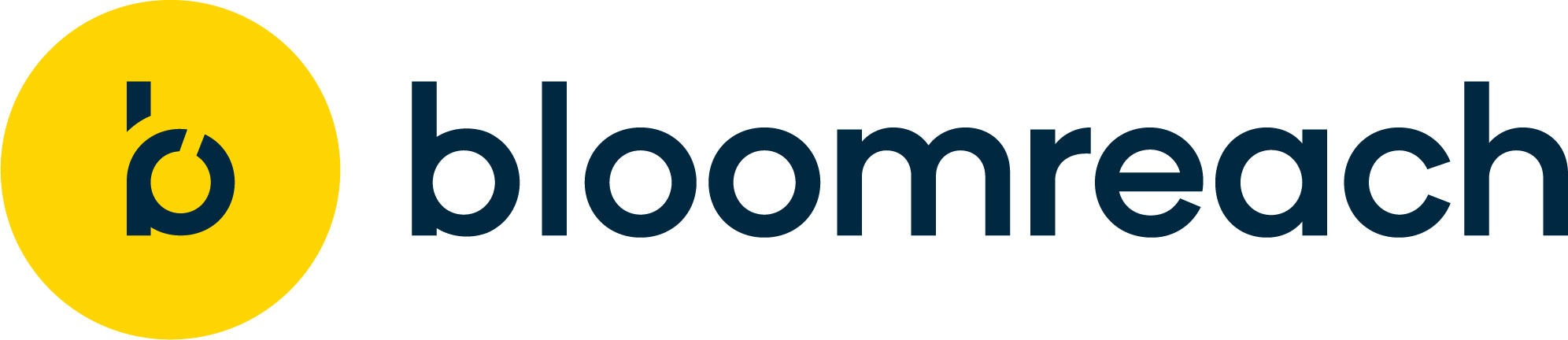
- Industry: marketing automation; software
- Founded: 2009
- Founder: Raj De Datta, Ashutosh Garg
- Website: https://www.bloomreach.com/en

Bloomreach is a cloud-based e-commerce experience platform and B2B service specializing in marketing automation, product discovery, and content management systems. The company, founded in 2009 by Raj De Datta and Ashutosh Garg, is headquartered in Mountain View, California.

== History ==
Bloomreach was founded in 2009 in Mountain View, California by Raj De Datta and Ashutosh Garg.

In 2012, it launched its first product, an SEO-focused tool.

The company focused on products centered around site search, which later evolved to include additional tools for merchandisers, such as product recommendations.

In 2013, the company brought big-data content optimization SaaS to the small screen.

In 2016, Bloomreach acquired Hippo CMS, an open-source Web Content Management company, creating a digital experience platform that combines content, search, and merchandising.,

In 2021, Bloomreach acquired Exponea, a customer data and experience platform that combined marketing, merchandising, and content. The same year, the company announced $150 million investment from Sixth Street Growth being valued at $900 million.

In 2022, Bloomreach announced $175 million in fresh funding, more than doubling its valuation to $2.2 billion.

== Operations ==
The company's products are Bloomreach Engagement, Bloomreach Discovery, and Bloomreach Content. Bloomreach Engagement is marketing automation software for managing email marketing campaigns, SMS messaging, mobile apps, and other marketing channels. Bloomreach Discovery is product discovery software that uses machine learning.

As of 2023, the company has 850 employees and serves 850 brands including Albertsons, Bosch, and Puma.
