= Document management system =

Organised collection of documents

A document management system (DMS) is a computerized system used to store, share, track and manage electronic files or documents. Some systems include version and revision tracking, where a history of the various versions created and modified by different users is recorded and stored. The term has some overlap with the concepts of content management systems. It is often viewed as a component of enterprise content management (ECM) and is related to product data management (PDM) systems, digital asset management, document imaging, workflow systems and records management systems.

== History ==
Electronic document management systems emerged in the 1980s as organisations sought to digitise paper-based records and reduce reliance on physical filing infrastructure. Early systems were designed primarily for document imaging — scanning, indexing, and retrieving paper records in electronic form — and were largely limited to large enterprises and government agencies due to the cost and complexity of the technology involved. Systems such as FileNet, founded in 1982, began combining imaging with basic workflow capabilities, establishing the functional model that subsequent products would develop further.

By the early 1990s, document management had become a distinct software category, with vendors introducing version control, access management, and full-text retrieval alongside the earlier imaging capabilities. The spread of personal computers and local area networks expanded adoption beyond specialist operators to knowledge workers more broadly; the unstructured nature of documents on distributed PC networks had exposed the absence of version control, audit trails, and access security, making dedicated document management systems increasingly necessary. As internet use became widespread through the late 1990s, user expectations around retrieval shifted considerably: rather than navigating folder hierarchies, users increasingly expected search-first interfaces, and capabilities including boolean queries, cluster analysis, and stemming became standard components of document management systems as a result.

As organisations accumulated growing volumes of web content, email, and digital media, the scope of document management systems proved insufficient for the full range of unstructured information that enterprises needed to govern. This drove the consolidation of document management, records management, workflow, and imaging into broader platforms; the term Enterprise Content Management was introduced around 2000 and formalised by the Association for Intelligent Information Management (AIIM) in 2002.

== Components ==
Document management systems provide storage, version control, metadata, audit trails, security and access controls, and more. Capabilities include:

Topic	Description
Metadata	Metadata is typically stored for each document. Metadata may, for example, include the date the document will be stored and the identity of the user storing it. The DMS may also extract metadata from the document automatically or prompt the user to add metadata. Some systems also use optical character recognition on scanned images, or perform text extraction on electronic documents. The resulting extracted text can be used to assist users in locating documents by identifying probable keywords or providing for full text search capability, or can be used on its own. Extracted text can also be stored as a component of metadata, stored with the document, or separately from the document as a source for searching document collections.
Integration	Many document management systems attempt to provide document management functionality directly to other applications, so that users may retrieve existing documents directly from the document management system repository, make changes, and save the changed document back to the repository as a new version, all without leaving the application. Such integration is commonly available for a variety of software tools such as workflow management and content management systems, typically through an application programming interface (API) using open standards such as ODMA, LDAP, WebDAV, and SOAP or RESTful web services.
Capture	Capture primarily involves accepting and processing images of paper documents from scanners or multifunction printers. Optical character recognition (OCR) software is often used, whether integrated into the hardware or as stand-alone software, in order to convert digital images into machine readable text. Optical mark recognition (OMR) software is sometimes used to extract values of check-boxes or bubbles. Capture may also involve accepting electronic documents and other computer-based files.
Data validation	Data validation rules can check for document failures, missing signatures, misspelled names, and other issues, recommending real-time correction options before importing data into the DMS. Additional processing in the form of harmonization and data format changes may also be applied as part of data validation.
Indexing	Indexing tracks electronic documents. Indexing may be as simple as keeping track of unique document identifiers; but often it takes a more complex form, providing classification through the documents' metadata or even through word indexes extracted from the documents' contents. Indexing exists mainly to support information query and retrieval. One area of critical importance for rapid retrieval is the creation of an index topology or scheme.
Storage	Store electronic documents. Storage of the documents often includes management of those same documents; where they are stored, for how long, migration of the documents from one storage media to another (hierarchical storage management) and eventual document destruction.
Retrieval	Retrieve the electronic documents from the storage. Although the notion of retrieving a particular document is simple, retrieval in the electronic context can be quite complex and powerful. Simple retrieval of individual documents can be supported by allowing the user to specify the unique document identifier, and having the system use the basic index (or a non-indexed query on its data store) to retrieve the document. More flexible retrieval allows the user to specify partial search terms involving the document identifier and/or parts of the expected metadata. This would typically return a list of documents which match the user's search terms. Some systems provide the capability to specify a Boolean expression containing multiple keywords or example phrases expected to exist within the documents' contents. The retrieval for this kind of query may be supported by previously built indexes, or may perform more time-consuming searches through the documents' contents to return a list of the potentially relevant documents. See also Document retrieval.
Distribution	A document ready for distribution has to be in a format that cannot be easily altered. An original master copy of the document is usually never used for distribution; rather, an electronic link to the document itself is more common. If a document is to be distributed electronically in a regulatory environment, then additional criteria must be met, including assurances of traceability and versioning, even across other systems. This approach applies to both of the systems by which the document is to be inter-exchanged, if the integrity of the document is imperative.
Security	Document security is vital in many document management applications. Compliance requirements for certain documents can be quite complex depending on the type of documents. For instance, in the United States, standards such as ISO 9001 and ISO 13485, as well as U.S. Food and Drug Administration regulations, dictate how the document control process should be addressed. Document management systems may have a rights management module that allows an administrator to give access to documents based on type to only certain people or groups of people. Document marking at the time of printing or PDF-creation is an essential element to preclude alteration or unintended use.
Workflow	Workflow is a complex process, and some document management systems have either a built-in workflow module or can integrate with workflow management tools. There are different types of workflow. Usage depends on the environment to which the electronic document management system (EDMS) is applied. Manual workflow requires a user to view the document and decide whom to send it to. Rules-based workflow allows an administrator to create a rule that dictates the flow of the document through an organization: for instance, an invoice passes through an approval process and then is routed to the accounts-payable department. Dynamic rules allow for branches to be created in a workflow process. A simple example would be to enter an invoice amount and if the amount is lower than a certain set amount, it follows different routes through the organization. Advanced workflow mechanisms can manipulate content or signal external processes while these rules are in effect.
Collaboration	Collaboration should be inherent in an EDMS. In its basic form, collaborative EDMS should allow documents to be retrieved and worked on by an authorized user. Access should be blocked to other users while work is being performed on the document. Other advanced forms of collaboration act in real time, allowing multiple users to view and modify (or markup) documents at the same time. The resulting document is comprehensive, including all users additions. Collaboration within document management systems means that the various markups by each individual user during the collaboration session are recorded, allowing document history to be monitored.
Versioning	Versioning is a process by which documents are checked in or out of the document management system, allowing users to retrieve previous versions and to continue work from a selected point. Versioning is useful for documents that change over time and require updating, but it may be necessary to go back to or reference a previous copy.
Searching	Searching finds documents and folders using template attributes or full text search. Documents can be searched using various attributes and document content.
Federated search	This refers to the capability to extend search capabilities to draw results from multiple sources, or from multiple DMSes within an enterprise.
Publishing	Publishing a document involves the procedures of proofreading, peer or public reviewing, authorizing, printing and approving etc. Those steps ensure prudence and logical thinking. Any careless handling may result in the inaccuracy of the document and therefore mislead or upset its users and readers. In law regulated industries, some of the procedures have to be completed as evidenced by their corresponding signatures and the date(s) on which the document was signed. Refer to the ISO divisions of ICS 01.140.40 and 35.240.30 for further information. The published document should be in a format that is not easily altered without a specific knowledge or tools, and yet it is read-only or portable.
Hard copy reproduction	Document/image reproduction is often necessary within a document management system, and its supported output devices and reproduction capabilities should be considered.

== Standardization ==
Many industry associations publish their own lists of particular document control standards that are used in their particular field. Following is a list of some of the relevant ISO documents. Divisions ICS 01.140.10 and 01.140.20. The ISO has also published a series of standards regarding the technical documentation, covered by the division of 01.110.

- ISO 2709 Information and documentation – Format for information exchange
- ISO 15836 Information and documentation – The Dublin Core metadata element set
- ISO 15489 Information and documentation – Records management
- ISO 21127 Information and documentation – A reference ontology for the interchange of cultural heritage information
- ISO 23950 Information and documentation – Information retrieval (Z39.50) – Application service definition and protocol specification
- ISO 10244 Document management – Business process baselining and analysis
- ISO 32000 Document management – Portable document format
- ISO/IEC 27001 Information security, cybersecurity and privacy protection — Information security management systems

== Document control ==
Government regulations typically require that companies working in certain industries control their documents. A Document Controller is responsible to control these documents strictly. These industries include accounting (for example: 8th EU Directive, Sarbanes–Oxley Act), food safety (for example the Food Safety Modernization Act in the US), ISO (mentioned above), medical device manufacturing (FDA), manufacture of blood, human cells, and tissue products (FDA), healthcare (JCAHO), and information technology (ITIL). Some industries work under stricter document control requirements due to the type of information they retain for privacy, warranty, or other highly regulated purposes. Examples include protected health information (PHI) as required by HIPAA or construction project documents required for warranty periods. An information systems strategy plan (ISSP) can shape organisational information systems over medium to long-term periods.

Documents stored in a document management system—such as procedures, work instructions, and policy statements—provide evidence of documents under control. Failing to comply can cause fines, the loss of business, or damage to a business's reputation.

Document control includes:

- reviewing and approving documents prior to release
- ensuring changes and revisions are clearly identified
- ensuring that relevant versions of applicable documents are available at their "points of use"
- ensuring that documents remain legible and identifiable
- ensuring that external documents (such as customer-supplied documents or supplier manuals) are identified and controlled
- preventing “unintended” use of obsolete documents

These document control requirements form part of an organisation's compliance costs alongside related functions such as a data protection officer and internal audit.

== Integrated DM ==
Integrated document management comprises the technologies, tools, and methods used to capture, manage, store, preserve, deliver and dispose of 'documents' across an enterprise. In this context 'documents' are any of a myriad of information assets including images, office documents, graphics, and drawings as well as the new electronic objects such as Web pages, email, instant messages, and video.

== Document management software ==
Paper documents have long been used in storing information. However, paper can be costly and, if used excessively, wasteful. Document management software is not simply a tool but it lets a user manage access, track and edit information stored. Document management software is an electronic cabinet that can be used to organize all paper and digital files. The software helps the businesses to combine paper to digital files and store it into a single hub after it is scanned and digital formats get imported. One of the most important benefits of digital document management is a “fail-safe” environment for safeguarding all documents and data. In the heavy construction industry specifically, document management software allows team members to securely view and upload documents for projects they are assigned to from anywhere and at any time to help streamline day-to-day operations.

== See also ==
- Construction collaboration technology
- Customer communications management
- Data proliferation
- Document automation
- Documentation
- Enterprise content management
- Information repository
- Information science
- Knowledge base
- Knowledge management
- Library science
- Product data management
- Revision control
- Snippet management
- Taxonomy (general)
- Technical data management system
- Technical documentation
