= List of PHP software and tools =

This is a list of software and programming tools for the PHP programming language, which includes libraries, debuggers, compilers, integrated development environments, frameworks, and related projects.

== Libraries and tools ==
- Aureus ERP – free and open-source enterprise resource planning application written in PHP and built with Laravel and FilamentPHP.
- Backdrop CMS – content management system
- BioPHP – bioinformatics
- CakePHP – open-source web framework model–view–controller
- CodeIgniter – open-source rapid web development framework for building dynamic web sites
- Doctrine Project – libraries primarily focused on providing persistence services and related functionality
- Drupal – open-source web content management system
- Fat-Free Framework – web framework
- FuelPHP – open-source web application framework
- GetSimple CMS – web content management system
- Guzzle — HTTP client library
- Gyroscope – framework and a code template system for building web backend systems
- Horde – web application framework
- Intelephense - a cross platform, cross editor PHP coding tool adhering to the Language Server Protocol (LSP)
- ImpressPages – content management system, MVC engine, inline editing, and drag&drop interface.
- Jamroom – web content management system
- Joomla – content management system
- Laminas Project – open-source object-oriented web application framework
- Laravel — web application framework
- li₃ – full-stack web framework
- MODX – open-source content management system and web application framework
- Monolog — logging library
- Neos Flow – web application framework
- Novius OS – content management system designed for internet publishing
- Phalcon – web framework based on the model–view–controller pattern
- PHP-Fusion – web framework based on PHP and MySQL & MariaDB that has an integrated content management system
- PHP-GTK – language bindings which allow GTK GUI applications to be written in PHP
- phpDocumentor – documentation generator that automatically parses PHP source code and produces readable documentation
- PHPEclipse – development plugin for the Eclipse IDE Framework
- PHPMailer — library for sending email
- PRADO – open-source, object-oriented, event-driven, component-based PHP web framework.
- Predis — client library for Redis
- ProcessWire – open source content management system, content management framework, and web application framework.
- ReactPHP — event-driven non-blocking I/O library
- RedBeanPHP — lightweight ORM for PHP simplifying database access
- RoadRunner – open-source application server and load-balancer for rapid application development
- SimpleXML – extension that allows users to easily manipulate/use XML data
- Slim — micro-framework
- Smart Framework PHP – web framework
- Symfony — reusable PHP components and web framework
- Textpattern – open-source content management system for PHP and MySQL
- Twig — template engine
- TYPO3 – content management framework and content management system
- wxPHP – extension that wraps the wxWidgets library
- XHP – augmentation of PHP and Hack to allow XML syntax to create custom and reusable HTML elements
- XOOPS - content management system
- Yii – open source, object-oriented, component-based, MVC, web application framework.
- Zend Engine – compiler and runtime environment
- Zend Framework — open-source framework for building web applications and services
- Zend Server – certified PHP distribution stack originally developed by Zend Technologies

== Integrated development environments ==
- CodeCharge Studio — rapid application development IDE for building database-driven web applications
- PhpStorm — commercial IDE for PHP from JetBrains
- Eclipse PDT — PHP Development Tools plugin for Eclipse
- NetBeans IDE — open-source IDE supporting PHP
- Visual Studio Code — general-purpose editor with PHP extensions
- Zend Studio

=== Online IDEs ===
- GitHub Codespaces
- Replit
- JDoodle
- W3Schools PHP Online Compiler

== Solution Stacks ==
- XAMPP
- MAMP
- FlyEnv
- ServBay

== Compilers ==
- HipHop Virtual Machine — open-source virtual machine for executing programs written in PHP and Hack
- PeachPie — modern PHP compiler to .NET, successor to Phalanger.
- Phalanger — PHP compiler to .NET framework (discontinued)

== Debugging tools ==
- Blackfire Profiler – SaaS service for Valgrind and tracks server resources like memory, CPU time, and I/O operations.
- PHP Console — Chrome extension for PHP error logging
- Xdebug — debugger and profiler using DBGp
- Zend Debugger — debugger integrated with Zend Studio

== Unit testing ==
- Behat — behavior-driven development testing framework for PHP
- Lime – unit testing and functional testing framework built specifically for the Symfony
- PHPUnit — unit testing framework

== Package managers ==
- Composer — application-level dependency manager
- PEAR package manager – legacy way to install, uninstall, or upgrade with new PEAR packages or PECL extensions

== PHP dialects ==
- Hack – dialect of PHP and compiles on the HipHop Virtual Machine
- Quercus — implementation of PHP in Java

== See also ==
- List of PHP accelerators
- List of PHP frameworks
- List of PHP extensions
- List of PHP software
- List of .NET libraries and frameworks
- List of C# software
- List of C++ software and tools
- List of C software and tools
- List of Java frameworks
- List of JavaScript libraries and List of JavaScript-based web frameworks
- List of Perl software and tools
- List of Python software
- List of Ruby software and tools
- List of computer books and List of software programming journals
- PHP syntax and semantics
