= List of PHP editors =

This article contains a list of text editors with features specific to the PHP scripting language.

== Free editors ==
Editor	License	Latest Version	Platform				Autocompletion	File Browser				GUI builder	Internal Browser	Version Control	PHP Debugger
Editor	License	Latest Version	Linux	macOS	Windows	Other	Autocompletion	Local	FTP	SFTP	SSH	GUI builder	Internal Browser	Version Control	PHP Debugger
Aptana Studio	APL/ GPLv1	3.6.1	Yes	Yes	Yes	JVM	Yes				?	Yes	Yes	?	With XDebug
Atom	MIT	1.13.1	Yes	Yes	Yes	FreeBSD	Yes				?	No	Yes	?	
Bluefish	GPLv3	2.2.15	Yes	Yes	Yes	FreeBSD	Yes	Yes	Yes	Yes	Yes	Yes	Yes	No	No
Brackets	MIT	1.8	Yes	Yes	Yes	No	Yes				?	No	Yes	?	
CodeLite	GPLv2	18.1	Yes	Yes	Yes	FreeBSD	Yes				?	No	Yes	?	
Eclipse PDT	EPL	7.0	Yes	Yes	Yes	JVM	Yes				?	Yes	Yes	Yes	With XDebug
Geany	GPLv2	1.29	Yes	Yes	Yes	FreeBSD, NetBSD, OpenBSD	Yes				?	Yes	Yes	?	
gedit	GPLv3	3.22.2	Yes	Yes	Yes	FreeBSD	Yes				?	Yes	Yes	?	With XDebug
GNU Emacs	GPLv3	27.1	Yes	Yes	Yes	BSDs, OpenSolaris	Yes	dired (builtin)	tramp (builitin)	tramp (builtin)	tramp (builitin)	Yes	Yes	vc (builtin)	?
jEdit	GPLv2	5.5.0	Yes	Yes	Yes	JVM	No	Yes	Yes	Yes	Yes	No	Yes	?	
Kate	GPLv2	16.08.1	Yes	Yes	Yes	FreeBSD	No	Yes	Yes	Yes	Yes	No	No	Yes	?
KWrite	GPLv2	16.08.1	Yes	Yes	No	FreeBSD	No				?	No	Yes	?	
KDevelop	GPLv2	5.0.3	Yes	Partial	Yes	FreeBSD	Yes				?	Yes	Yes	Yes	?
Komodo Edit	MPL	10.1.2	Yes	Yes	Yes	?	Yes				?	Yes	Yes	No	
NetBeans	CDDL/ GPLv2/ LGPLv2.1	30 (11 May 2026) [±]	Yes	Yes	Yes	JVM	Yes	Yes	Yes	Yes	Yes	Yes	Yes	Yes	With XDebug
Notepad++	GPL	7.2.2	No	No	Yes	No	Yes	No	No	No	No	No	No	Yes	With XDebug
SciTE	GPLv2	3.7.1	Yes	Yes	Yes	FreeBSD	No				?	No	Yes	?	
Sublime Text	Shareware	4113	Yes	Yes	Yes	?	Yes								
TextMate	GPLv1	1.5	No	Yes	No	No	Yes				?	No	Yes	?	
Vim	Vim License	9.0	Yes	Yes	Yes	Yes	Yes	Yes	Yes	Yes	Yes	No	Yes	Yes	
Visual Studio Code	MIT	This template is not used anymore. The latest stable and pre-release versions are maintained in Wikidata and they appear automatically in the main article for Visual Studio Code.	Yes	Yes	Yes	No	Yes				?	No	Yes	?	

=== Cross-platform ===
- Aptana Studio – Eclipse-based IDE, able to use PDT plugins, visual JS editor. Open-source, free project. (Community edition merged in).
- Atom – free and open-source text editor with out-of-the-box PHP support.
- Bluefish – free and open-source advanced editor with many web specific functions, has PHP syntax highlighting, auto-completion, function list, PHP function documentation, WebDAV, FTP, and SSH/SFTP support for uploading
- Brackets – free and open-source editor in HTML5/NodeJS by Adobe Team the best for integration frontend
- CodeLite – an open source, cross platform IDE for C/C++ and PHP. The built-in plugins supports SVN, SSH/SFTP access, Git database browsing and others.
- Eclipse – PHP Development Tools (PDT) and PHPEclipse projects. With additional plugins supports SVN, CVS, database modelling, SSH/FTP access, database navigation, Trac integration, and others.
- Editra – open source editor. Syntax highlighting and (partial) code completion for PHP + HTML and other IDE-like features like code browser etc.
- Emacs – advanced text editor. The nXhtml addon has special support for PHP (and other template languages). The major mode web-mode.el is designed for editing mixed HTML templates.
- Geany – syntax highlighting for HTML + PHP. Provides PHP function list.
- jEdit – free/open source editor. Supports SFTP and FTP.
- Komodo Edit – general purpose scripting language editor with support for PHP. Free version of the commercial ActiveState Komodo IDE.
- Netbeans – IDE with PHP support and integration with web standards. Supports SFTP and FTP. Full support for SVN and Git since 7.2 and powerful plugin support for added functionality.
- SciTE – PHP syntax highlighting, compiler integration, powerful config via Lua API.
- Vim – provides PHP syntax highlighting, debugging.

=== Windows ===
- ConTEXT – *No longer under development* Freeware editor with syntax highlighting.
- Crimson Editor – Lightweight editor. Supports FTP.
- Microsoft WebMatrix – A combined editor, server and publishing environment, syntax highlighting for HTML, PHP, Razor, node.js, C# and JavaScript and publishing through WebDeploy and FTP. Supports multiple file encodings as of version 2.
- Notepad2 – Simple editor with syntax highlighting
- Notepad++ – FLOSS multi-language editor with macro support, syntax highlighting (possible export to HTML), code completion, php.net function reference, foldable code blocks etc.; expandable via plugins, e.g. (S)FTP support, version control (Git, SVN), documentation generators, snippet support, spell checking, custom classes completion, code beautifiers
- PSPad – Supports FTP; syntax highlighting.
- RJ TextEd – Text editor with many great features

=== macOS ===
- Coda (web development software) – Shareware IDE/Editor
- Smultron
- TextWrangler – Supports SFTP and FTP

=== Linux ===
- gedit
- gPHPEdit
- Kate – Supports any file access protocol that is supported by KIO. This includes HTTP, FTP, SSH, SMB and WebDAV.
- KDevelop – Supports everything as Kate above with addition of references of functions and syntax parser.
- Kwrite

== Proprietary editors ==
- ActiveState Komodo IDE – Support for PHP syntax checking, debugging, trial available (NOTE: As of 2020, ActiveState Komodo is now completely free, and only requires that you register an account in order to use)
- Adobe Dreamweaver – Supports SFTP and FTP; Trial available
- BBEdit – Supports SFTP and FTP; Trial available
- Cloud9 – Online editor (supports multiple languages)
- Coda – Supports SFTP and FTP; Trial available
- CodeCharge Studio – Supports FTP
- Codelobster – Editor with syntax highlighting, debugger, code validation, supports FTP.
- Codenvy – Cloud development environment.
- EmEditor
- HyperEdit – Integrates PHP, JavaScript and HTML in an only interface WYSIWYG.
- JetBrains PhpStorm – PHP IDE with editor, on-the-fly code analysis and other web development specific tools including FTP/SFTP synchronization; Trial available
- Komodo IDE – Cross-platform integrated development environment for PHP as well as Python, Ruby and Perl.
- Microsoft Expression Web – Full PHP support with syntax highlighting, etc.; Trial available
- PHPEdit – Supports SFTP and FTP
- PHP Tools for Visual Studio PHP syntax highlighting, debugger, code validation, testing, support for other languages, among others. One- month trial available
- Rapid PHP Editor – Support for PHP syntax checking, auto-complete, debug and support for CSS, Javascript and HTML
- SlickEdit
- Smultron
- SourceLair – Online IDE for PHP, as well as JavaScript and Python
- TextPad – Trial available
- UltraEdit – Supports SFTP and FTP; Trial available
- Zend Studio – (Cross platform) professional PHP IDE, based on the PHP Development Tools plugin for the Eclipse platform; Trial available

== See also ==
- List of PHP software and tools
