= Neo =

Neo or NEO may refer to:

== People and language ==
- NEO (Counter-Strike player) (born 1987), screen name of Polish professional Counter-Strike player Filip Kubski
- Neo (given name)
- Neo (surname)
- Neo, the Hokkien/Teochew form of the Chinese family name Liang
- Neopronouns, or neos in slang term
- Neo (constructed language), a constructed language created by Arturo Alfandari

== Arts and entertainment ==
=== Fictional entities ===
- Neo (The Matrix), the alias of Thomas Anderson, a hacker and the protagonist of the Matrix film series
- Neo (Marvel Comics species), a fictional race of superhumans
- Neo, short for Neopolitan, a character from the animated series RWBY
- Spamton NEO, a character in the videogame Deltarune
- Mettaton NEO, another character in the game Undertale
- Neo, Kakao Friends characters

=== Music ===
==== Music groups ====
- Ne Obliviscaris (band), sometimes abbreviated NeO, an Australian heavy metal band
- N.E.O. (band), a Lithuanian band
- Neo (British band), a post-punk band
- Neo (Hungarian band), a Hungarian group
- Neo (Indonesian rap group), an Indonesian hip hop musician
- Neo (Italian band), a prog-jazz group

==== Albums and songs ====
- Neo (album), a 1979 album by Ian North
- "N.E.O.", a song by Chai

=== Television ===
- Neo Magazin Royale, a German satirical talk show
- ZDFneo, a German television channel

=== Other media ===
- Neo (magazine), an anime, manga and Asian film magazine published in the UK
- Neo (nightclub), a Chicago nightclub opened in 1979
- PlayStation 4 Pro (codename Neo), a high end version of the PlayStation 4 console
- Radio NEO, a defunct radio station in Aichi Prefecture, Japan

== Computing and electronics ==
- Neo (keyboard), a portable keyboard by AlphaSmart
- Neo (keyboard layout), an ergonomic keyboard layout
- NEO (cryptocurrency), a cryptocurrency and blockchain platform
- Neo 1973, smartphone running Openmoko software
- Samsung Galaxy Note 3 Neo, a smartphone made by Samsung
- .NEO, the file extension for computer images in the NEOchrome format
- Neo (French law enforcement agencies mobile terminals) and NeoGend, a project of secure smartphones and tablets for the French National Police and gendarmerie
- NEO, software products based on Sun Microsystems' Project Distributed Objects Everywhere
- MacBook Neo, an Apple laptop line
- Surface Neo, an unreleased dual-screen PC by Microsoft
- DJI Neo, a teleoperated quadcopter drone for vlogging, by Chinese company DJI
- NEO, a bipedal humanoid robot by Norwegian-American company 1X Technologies for home use

== Transportation ==
- Nissan Ecology Oriented or NEO VVL, an automobile variable valve timing technology
- New Engine Option, fuel-efficient re-engined versions of certain Airbus aircraft:
  - Airbus A320neo family
  - Airbus A330neo
- Proton Satria Neo, an automotive brand
- Mahindra Bolero Neo, a rebadged Mahindra TUV300 SUV since reintroduction in 2021
- Youngcopter Neo, a German helicopter design

== Other uses ==
- Near-Earth object, small body with a Sun orbit close to Earth's
- Neomycin (AKA framycetin), a type of oral and topical aminoglycoside antibiotic
- Neo, Vietnam, a former township in Bac Giang Province, Vietnam
- NEO Exchange, a Canadian stock exchange
- Neo (venture capital firm), an American startup accelerator founded in 2017
- New European Order, a neo-fascist Europe-wide alliance set up in 1951 to promote Pan-European nationalism
- Non-combatant evacuation operation, an operation conducted to evacuate a country's civilians from another country
- an abbreviation for Northeastern Oklahoma A&M College
- Revised NEO Personality Inventory, a psychometric instrument

== See also ==
- NCT (band), Neo Culture Technology, a K-pop boy band
- NEO Scavenger, a 2014 survival video game released on PC
- Neos (disambiguation)
- Ne-Yo (born 1979), American pop and R&B singer-songwriter
- Nio, two wrath-filled and muscular guardians of the Buddha
- NIO (disambiguation)
