= Neos =

Neos or NEOS may refer to:

- Neos (airline), an Italian airline
- NEOS (Austria), a political party in Austria
- Neos (pistol), a type of Beretta pistol
- Neos (record label), a German record label
- Neos Finance, an Italian bank
- NEOS Server, mathematical optimization software system
- Near-Earth objects
  - NEO Surveyor, which will look for near-Earth objects
- NEOS Library Consortium, a Canadian network of Libraries
- TYPO3 Neos, an opensource content management system
- Yamaha Neos, a moped
- NeosVR, a virtual reality metaverse
- Neopronouns, or neos in slang term

== See also ==
- Neo (disambiguation)
- Neos Flow, a free and open source web application framework
