= Guzzle =

Guzzle may refer to:

- Guzzle (PHP library), a HTTP client library
- Guzzle, a Transformers character
- Guzzle, a 1990 album by Hoss
