= List of PHP extensions =

This is the present list of all officially documented extensions for the PHP programming language.

- Apache
- BCMath
- Brotli
- Bzip2
- Calendars
- CCVS
- ClibPDF
- COM
- cURL
- DB++
- IBM Db2
- dBase
- DBM
- dbx
- DOM XML
- FileMaker Pro
- filePro
- GNU FriBidi
- FrontBase
- FTP
- GD Graphics Library
- Gettext
- GNU Multi-Precision Library
- Hyperwave
- iconv
- IMAP, POP3 and NNTP
- Informix
- Ingres II
- Instance ID
- InterBase
- IRC
- LDAP
- Lotus Notes
- mailparse
- MCAL
- Mcrypt
- MCVE
- Mhash
- MIME Functions
- Ming
- mnoGoSearch
- Mohawk
- MS-SQL
- mSQL
- muscat
- MySQL
- Ncurses
- ODBC
- OpenSSL
- Oracle
- Ovrimos SQL
- PayFlow Pro
- PDF
- PDO
- Phalcon
- POSIX
- PostgreSQL
- Printer
- Pspell
- QT-Dom
- GNU Readline
- GNU Recode
- Regular expressions
- Semaphores
- SESAM
- Session Handling
- Shared memory
- SMTP
- SNMP
- SimpleXML
- Sockets
- SQLite
- Streams
- Sybase
- Token
- vpopmail
- WDDX
- Win32 API
- xajax
- XML (Xpath)
- XML-RPC
- XSLT
- YAZ
- Yellow pages / NIS
- ZIP
- Zlib
- Wjs

== See also ==
- Extension Categorization from the official PHP Manual
