= WampServer =

Web server software stack

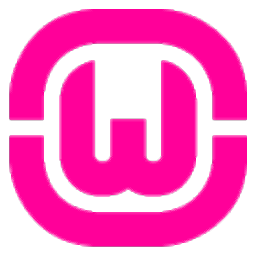
- Original author: Romain Bourdon
- Stable release: 3.3.8 / 24 April 2025; 15 months ago
- Operating system: Windows
- Platform: Microsoft Windows
- Size: ~350MB (x86) / ~500MB (x64)
- Available in: 28 languages
- List of languages Arabic, Bulgarian, Catalan, Chinese, Croatian, Czech, Danish, Dutch, English, Estonian, Finnish, French, German, Greek, Hungarian, Italian, Latvian, Macedonian, Norwegian, Occitan, Persian, Polish, Portuguese, Romanian, Russian, Spanish, Swedish, Turkish
- Type: Web server stack package
- License: GNU GPL
- Website: www.wampserver.com
- Repository: wampserver.aviatechno.net

WampServer refers to a solution stack for the Microsoft Windows operating system, created by Romain Bourdon and consisting of the Apache web server, OpenSSL for SSL support, MySQL database and PHP programming language.

== Notable lists, variants, and equivalents on other platforms ==
- LAMP: for the Linux operating system (The original AMP stack – explained here)
- MAMP: for the macOS operating system
- SAMP: for Solaris operating system
- WIMP: A similar package where the Apache is replaced by Internet Information Services (IIS)
- WISA: solution stack for Windows (operating system), consisting of Internet Information Services, Microsoft SQL Server, and ASP.NET
- XAMPP: A cross-platform web server solution stack package

== See also ==
- Comparison of server-side web frameworks
- LAMP (software bundle)
