= Joomla =

Free and open-source web content management system

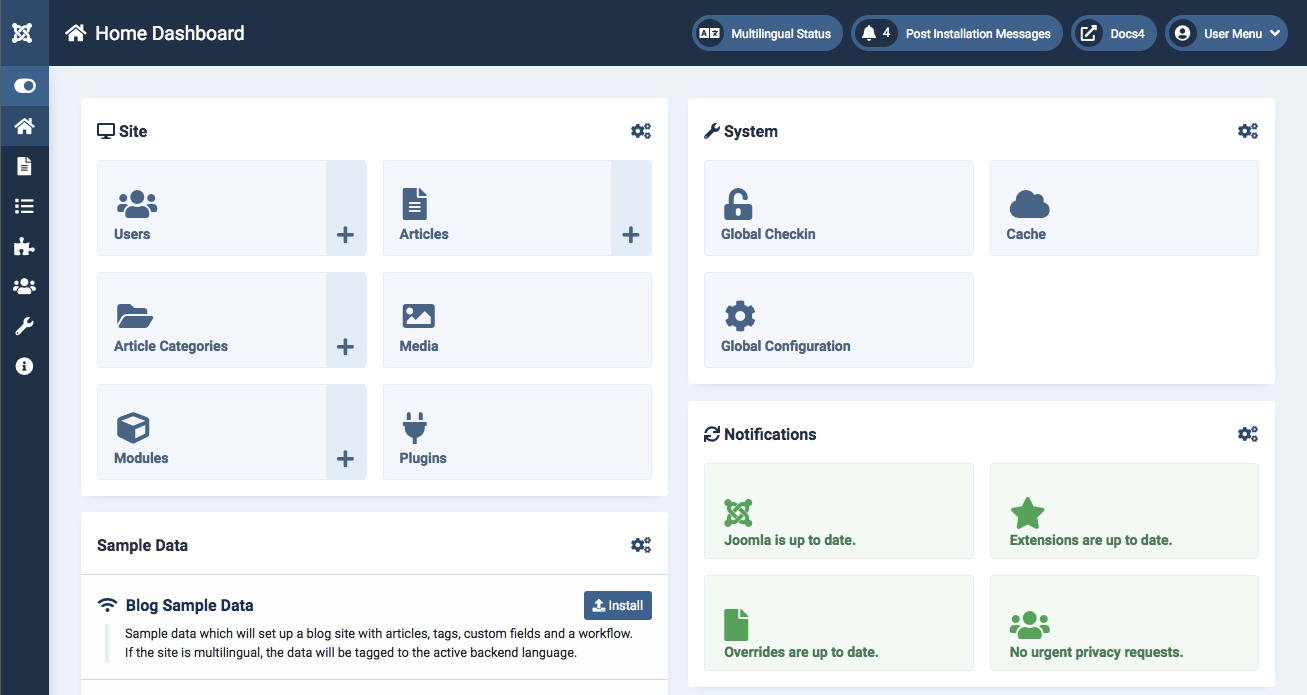
- Main Joomla admin interface
- Developer: Open Source Matters
- Release: 17 August 2005
- Stable release: 6.1.4 / 29 September 2026; 27 days ago
- Written in: PHP, JavaScript
- Operating system: Microsoft Windows, Unix-like operating system
- Type: content management system
- License: GNU General Public License, version 2.0 or later
- Website: https://www.joomla.org
- Repository: https://github.com/joomla/joomla-cms

Joomla (/ˈdʒuːm.lɑː/), also styled Joomla! (with an exclamation mark) and sometimes abbreviated as J!, is a free and open-source content management system (CMS) for publishing web content on websites. Web content applications include discussion forums, photo galleries, e-Commerce and user communities, and numerous other web-based applications. Joomla is developed by a community of volunteers supported with the legal, organisational and financial resources of Open Source Matters, Inc.

Joomla is written in PHP, uses object-oriented programming techniques and simple software design patterns, and stores data in a Structured Query Language (MySQL/MariaDB) database. Joomla includes features such as page caching, RSS feeds, blogs, search, and support for language internationalisation. It is built on a model–view–controller web application framework that can be used independently of the CMS.

Among CMSes, Joomla ranks fifth or sixth in global market share.

== History ==
=== 2005–2007 ===
Joomla was the outcome of a fork of Mambo on 17 August 2005. At that time, the Mambo name was a trademark of Miro International Pvt. Ltd., which formed a non-profit foundation with the stated purpose of funding the project and protecting it from lawsuits. The Joomla development team claimed that many of the provisions of the foundation structure violated previous agreements made by the elected Mambo Steering Committee, lacked the necessary consultation with key stakeholders, and included provisions that violated core open source values.

Joomla's original co-founders, Andrew Eddie, Brian Teeman, Johan Janssens, Jean-Marie Simonet, et al., established Open Source Matters, Inc. (OSM) to distribute information to the software community. Project leader Eddie wrote a letter that appeared on the announcements section of the public forum at mamboserver.com. Over a thousand people joined OpenSourceMatters.org within a day, most posting words of encouragement and support. Miro CEO Peter Lamont responded publicly to the development team in an article titled "The Mambo Open Source Controversy—20 Questions With Miro". This event created controversy within the free software community about the definition of open source. Forums of other open-source projects were active with postings about the actions of both sides.

In the two weeks following Eddie's announcement, teams were reorganised, and the community continued to grow. Eben Moglen and the Software Freedom Law Center (SFLC) assisted the Joomla core team beginning in August 2005, as indicated by Moglen's blog entry from that date and a related OSM announcement. The SFLC continues to provide legal guidance to the Joomla Project as one of OSM's partners.

On 18 August, Eddie called for community input to suggest a name for the project. The core team reserved the right to make the final naming decision and chose a name not suggested by the community. On 22 September, the new name, Joomla!, was announced. It is the anglicised spelling of the Swahili word jumla, meaning "all together" or "as a whole," which also has a similar meaning in at least Amharic, Arabic, Turkic languages and Urdu. On 26 September, the development team called for logo submissions from the community and invited the community to vote on the logo. The team announced the community's decision on 29 September. Beginning in October 2005, guidelines covering branding, licensing, and use of the registered trademark were published.

=== 2008–2011 ===
On 28 January 28 2008 the first major revision to Joomla was announced:

Joomla 1.5 was popular but criticised for its inflexible and limited approach to access control. Independently of the project, Andrew Eddie and Louis Landry created a company called JXtended to continue the development of Control—an ACL component—that could integrate with Joomla 1.5. In July 2009, Eddie presented his ideas to the Joomla User Group Brisbane.

In July 2009 of that year, the Joomla project announced a restructuring of its management: a new Joomla Leadership Team replacing the Core Team that had originally led the project. This redefined the role of the team leading the project and structured it more around community involvement in events, the Google Summer of Code projects, and other activities; the intention of the new approach to team-building was also an effort to increase community participation in the development process instead of relying upon a small group of coders to do most of the work.

According to Google Trends, interest in Joomla peaked around the period 2009–2010. In January 2011—largely as the result of the collaboration between Eddie and Landry—a second major revision of Joomla was released: Joomla 1.6.

Prior to the stable release of Joomla 1.6, Eddie relinquished his roles on OSM's board and project leadership; Louis Landry announced his retirement from the project the following year. Following Eddie's departure in September 2011, OSM sought feedback from the community, including the possibility of constituting the governing body under a new name, to restructure the board's membership and project leadership.

==== Molajo ====
In 2010, with preparations for Joomla 1.6 nearly completed, Amy Stephen, Klas Berlic, Marco Barbosa, Matt Thomas, et al. started a project to refactor the Joomla code. Code-named Molajo (an anagram of Joomla), the group felt that the existing Joomla CMS hindered end-users and developers adopting Joomla because (a) the Joomla CMS did not offer a range of packages containing themed sets of web applications—like other CMS products had been doing for some time—and (b) the traditional MVC approach decreased developers' productivity in creating new components for Joomla.

Community reaction to Molajo was mixed. Some commentators claimed that it was a fork of the Joomla CMS—a claim strongly rejected by Stephen—while others contended that its activities would undermine the future of the Joomla CMS. Against these headwinds, Molajo made its public debut at the J and Beyond conference in the Netherlands in 2011.

Lacking support from OSM, an enthusiastic following from the Joomla community, and unable to progress beyond pre-Alpha status, Molajo collapsed around the middle of 2015.

=== 2012–2014 ===
In January 2012, another major revision was announced: Joomla 2.5 (essentially bringing together the two previous minor releases from the preceding year). Joomla 2.5 brought much sought-after enhancements, a new API making it easier for novice users, additional multilanguage capability and the ability for users to update with "one-click".

Shortly after the release of Joomla 2.5, work was under way on Joomla 3.x. Joomla 3.x was focused on mobile-friendly websites on the front-end as well as a more intuitive back-end. With greater ease in site navigation and a more user-friendly means of editing Joomla site content, Joomla 3.x became the most popular version of the CMS, eventually making all previous versions obsolete.

In March 2014, after seeking community feedback and a submission from the Production Leadership Team, a newly constituted OSM board approved changing the licensing for the framework from GPLv2 to LGPL. Although the proposal only affected the licensing of the framework and not the CMS, the decision sparked a fierce debate within the community. In the end, the framework did not adopt LGPL and is still licensed under GPLv2.

In August 2014, the Joomla CMS development team released a plan for new version releases.

Towards the end of 2014—three years after calling for feedback about ways to reorganise the project and with Joomla 3.x into its fourth minor revision—the community discussed the leadership structure changes. Eddie, although no longer an active contributor to the project, argued that the code for Joomla 3.x was "too fat and heavy to maintain with the current level of contribution"; he recommended mothballing the current CMS series and developing a less cumbersome Joomla 4. Eddie went further to criticise OSM's vision, entrepreneurship, and management of the project. Other commentators also expressed their opinion that OSM had become dysfunctional.

=== 2015–2018 ===
Criticism mounted about the plan for future development of the Joomla CMS. An opinion written in May 2015 by Nicholas Dionysopoulos (founder of Akeeba Ltd.) shared some of Eddie's earlier observations about OSM's lack of vision, entrepreneurship, and ability to manage the project. Dionysopoulos disagreed with Eddie about the major cause of problems with Joomla 3.x; it was Dionysopoulos' view that the cause of most problems with Joomla 3.x lay within "the processes of Joomla! the organisation".

Dionysopoulos' views gathered momentum within the community and led to the formation of the Joomla 4 working group (which later became the Joomla X working group).

In March 2017, the project announced the retirement of Joomla 3 and unveiled its plans to develop Joomla 4. This effectively brought an end to the work of the Joomla X working group (although it would be another two years before that Joomla X working group's activity was placed in "archived" status).

In an effort to improve the relationship with the community, the development team revised the 2014 plan and, in June 2018, produced a new roadmap with the expectation that Joomla 4.0 would be released in a stable form before the end of 2018. During the period 2017-2018, the developers created six alpha test releases for Joomla 4.

=== 2019–2020 ===
In January 2019, the developers released an updated plan revising previously announced estimated time frames; the roadmap was revised several times during 2020.

Community concerns intensified about the handling of the Joomla project—two years after announcing plans to retire Joomla 3 (but having already released two minor versions with plans for a third)—and by the end of 2019, a further six alpha test releases of Joomla 4 were produced for public discussion. On one hand, some people questioned whether the community had lost its influence in driving the project, while, from the developers' viewpoint, the other side defended the project by observing that things would be more productive if the community had been more actively engaged in testing, rather than criticising, the alpha releases. These discussions revealed a growing sense of division between developers on one side and end users on the other.

A lengthy debate that started in March 2019 and initially focused on the aesthetics and usability of the Joomla 4 backend interface highlighted an overall sense of disappointment with management and progress of the project. Although the debate was weighted heavily on criticising the backend aesthetics, people on all sides of the discussion aired their dissenting opinions about why the Joomla 4 project had become distracted by feature creep, software bloat, eventual cost overrun and lack of trust.

Against a background of unrelenting criticism from within the community and declining popular interest in Joomla at the time a conference was held in January 2020 to develop a strategy for the future. The conference identified several key areas for further work but basically accepted the premise that faults related mainly to the project's organisational framework rather than the quality of the product.

On 28 May 2020, the Joomla team disclosed that a data breach had occurred that potentially affected 2,700 users by exposing their personal details. The incident was discovered by an internal audit of the website that also highlighted the presence of superuser accounts owned by individuals outside OSM. Although no evidence was found of any unauthorised access to personal information, action was immediately taken to mitigate the risk, including a requirement for all users to change their passwords.

The COVID-19 pandemic impacted Joomla's planned events, resulting in the cancellation of the main world-wide conferences.

On 21 June 2020 OSM President Rowan Hoskyns Abrahall resigned citing personal difficulties. It later transpired that OSM Board had not been publicly forthcoming about matters relating to the several claims for reimbursement of Abrahall's expenses that were deemed to be outside OSM's financial policy and, further, that Abrahall now owed money to OSM; the matter received some independent coverage and analysis.

=== 2021–2025 ===
After Abrahall's successor, Brian Mitchell, departed as President, OSM reorganised its board structure removing three of its director roles. The increasing use social media—especially for microblogging—impacted the uptake of CMS technology to build websites. The Joomla project also lost a significant part of its volunteer base as a result of an ageing population, continuing disillusionment about the future direction and a perceived absence of transparency about the board's activities.

On 17 August 2021, Joomla version 4.0 was released (some six years after work had begun). This was a major milestone release for the Joomla project.

In 2022 Abrahall commenced defamation action against OSM; the case ended in March 2023.

The Joomla 4 project did not live up to developers' expectations; work soon commenced on Joomla 5—released on 17 October 2023—in appearance, Joomla 4 with some of its legacy code removed.

Joomla 5 uptake was slow (compared to previous releases) and user criticism further intensified. Joomla users had problems because their web hosting providers did not meet more restrictive minimum technical requirements; furthermore, upgrading from previous releases resulted in users having to forego their reliance on third-party extensions and rebuild their websites. Criticism was especially heaviest among third-party developers.

To assist with the transition to Joomla 5 and upgrade challenges the project introduced a "backward compatibility plugin" in Joomla 5.0 as a temporary bridge, enabling many Joomla 4 extensions and templates to function while developers updated their code to the new framework. Implemented in a manner so it loaded before other plugins it provided aliasing for deprecated Joomla 4 classes; official guidance described it as an interim solution that would be phased out by Joomla 6, when legacy deprecations from Joomla 4 would be removed from the core and, if necessary, handled during that upgrade cycle.

Joomla continued to remain popular with its adherents but, as the continuing downward trend showed, confined to small niche market amongst hobbyists and SMBs, unsuited to large corporate use.

=== 2025–present ===
Joomla version 6 was released on 14 October 2025.

Around 11 November 2025 half of OSM's board's members tendered their resignations citing personal reasons. OSM members requested a special general meeting to demand answers from OSM President Maria Skampoura. Prior to the meeting on 16 December 2025, Skampoura also tendered her resignation from the board.

== Development and support ==
=== Developers ===
Joomla is maintained as an open-source project by a community of volunteers and licensed under the GNU General Public License without any warranty of any kind, including implied warranties of merchantability and fitness for a particular purpose. The source code of Joomla is maintained on GitHub. The top three most popular public forums for discussing Joomla and seeking technical advice are The Joomla Forum™, Joomla on Stack Exchange and Mattermost.

=== Development lifecycle ===
Joomla adopted a new development strategy with the introduction of 1.6. The basic idea was to facilitate a continuous publication of Standard Support Release (SSR) intended to ensure that user requests were incorporated into the Joomla core more quickly and stabilised for the benefit of future releases. Many users were critical of the rapid change between major releases, especially when complex applications had been independently developed for a Joomla website and the website owner had to update the core in order to receive current security updates.

In April 2014 the developers announced that the previous system consisting of different LTR (Long Term Release) and STR (Short Term Release) version rails would be abandoned in favour of a linear version cycle. The first release after this change was version 3.3.1.

In April 2025, the Joomla! Project announced that major releases would occur at two-yearly intervals.

=== Security ===
Joomla installations are repeatedly the target of attacks, especially in the form of so-called defacements, but probably no more so when compared to other websites on the internet. Third-party extensions can add additional security risks that may be exploited by malicious actors: a list of vulnerable extensions is maintained on an ad hoc basis. While programming-related security flaws occur, the majority of security issues arise from people failing to perform regular maintenance as opposed to the intentional exploitation by the malicious actions of others. Joomla addresses reported security concerns through its Security Strike Team.

Joomla versions
Series	Released as	Release date	Supported until	Main feature(s)
1.x	1.0	17 Sep 2005	22 Jul 2009	Rebranded release of Mambo 4.5.2.3 that combined other bug and moderate-level security fixes. Written for PHP 4.
1.x	1.5	21 Jan 2008	30 Sep 2012	Overhauled Graphical user interface, templates, limited "legacy mode" support. Written for PHP 5. Notes: First long-term support (LTS) version although not backwardly-compatible with its predecessor. Such LTS versions were to have been released every three major or minor releases and supported until three months after the next LTS version is released; this approach was not followed in practice.
1.x	1.6	10 Jan 2011	19 Aug 2011	Added full access control list functionality, a user-defined category hierarchy and admin interface improvements.
1.x	1.7	19 Jul 2011	24 Feb 2012	Enhanced security and improved migration tools.
2.5	2.5	24 Jan 2012	31 Dec 2014	New "Smart Search" component, added support for using Microsoft SQL Server as a database backend, added user notes, additional enhancements and security improvements. Notes: Second LTS release. Originally this release was to be named 1.8.0, however the developers announced August 9 that they would rename it to fit into a new version number scheme in which every LTS release is an x.5 release.
3.x	3.0	27 Sep 2012	31 May 2013	New default templates based on Bootstrap; added support for PostgreSQL as a database backend; remove support for PHP 5.2. Notes: The original plan was to release this version in July 2012; however, the January/July release schedule was uncomfortable for volunteers, and the schedule was changed to September/March releases. On 24 December 2012 it was decided to include an unforeseen addition to the 3.x series to improve the development life cycle and extend the support of LTS versions.
3.x	3.1	23 Apr 2013	31 Dec 2013	Article tagging.
3.x	3.2	6 Nov 2013	20 Oct 2014	Content versioning for articles. Notes: Because of a PHP requirement change in Joomla 3.3, extended security support was provided for 3.2 for six months after 3.3's release.
3.x	3.3	20 Apr 2014	25 Feb 2015	Improved password hashing; microdata support; removed MooTools dependencies. Notes: On 25 April 2014, the Joomla Production Leadership Team announced that it started following 'Semantic Versioning Scheme' for new Joomla builds. The earlier Long-term support and Short-term support lifecycle policy was cancelled. Joomla version 3.3.1 was the first version released under the new development strategy.
3.x	3.4	25 Feb 2015	21 Mar 2016	Improved security advancements; Composer integration; and Google's No CAPTCHA reCAPTCHA. Notes: Extensive security revisions were rolled out in October 2015 with the release of Version 3.4.5.
3.x	3.5	21 Mar 2016	12 Jul 2016	Changes to admin interface (including some ability for drag and drop images). Notes: Added PHP 7 support. Added an opt-in feature to upload anonymous server statistics about environments where Joomla is being used.
3.x	3.6	12 Jul 2016	25 Apr 2017	Improvements to UX, software updates.
3.x	3.7	25 Apr 2017	19 Sep 2017	Custom fields; backend menu manager; improved update system, cache systems and package/extension management; some UX improvements.
3.x	3.8	19 Sep 2017	30 Oct 2018	Improved Routing System; Joomla 4 Compatibility Layer; optional installable sample data; code improvements and encryption support (using Sodium extension on PHP 7.2 or via polyfill for lower supported versions).
3.x	3.9	30 Oct 2018	16 Aug 2021	Privacy Tool Suite, in response to new privacy and data retention laws and regulations, viz. in particular, the GDPR.
3.x	3.10	16 Aug 2021	17 Aug 2023	Bridge between Joomla 3.x and Joomla 4.x.
4.x	4.0	17 Aug 2021	15 Feb 2022	Remove support for PHP 5 and Microsoft SQL Server. Notes: Added PHP 8 support.
4.x	4.1	15 Feb 2022	16 Aug 2022	Task scheduling; child templates; accessibility checker; syntax highlighting; inline help.
4.x	4.2	16 Aug 2022	18 Apr 2023	Keyboard shortcuts; Multi-factor Authentication.
4.x	4.3	18 Apr 2023	17 Oct 2023	"Guided tours"
4.x	4.4	17 Oct 2023	14 Oct 2025	Bridge between Joomla 4.x and Joomla 5.x
5.x	5.0	17 Oct 2023	16 Apr 2024	Improved Schema.org integration and security. Notes: Imposes additional minimum technical requirements for PHP 8.2 and MySQL 8.0 or equivalent
5.x	5.1	16 Apr 2024	15 Oct 2024	"Dark mode" enhancements; "welcome tour"; further SEO optimisation; integrate with TUF
5.x	5.2	15 Oct 2024	15 Apr 2025	Multilingual menu improvements; conditional field display
5.x	5.3	15 Apr 2025	14 Oct 2025	Added support for PHP 8.4
5.x	5.4	14 Oct 2025	14 Oct 2027	Automated Core Update, Joomla 6.0 compatibility plugin
6.x	6.0	14 Oct 2025	14 Apr 2026	Automatic updates
6.x	6.1	14 Apr 2026	14 Oct 2029	Proof-of-work CAPTCHA, Visual workflow editor
Legend: Unsupported Supported Latest version Future version

== Community ==
=== General ===
The Joomla project manages its activities (e.g. trademarking, licensing, marketing, software development, documentation, media releases, etc.) through dedicated teams under the umbrella of Open Source Matters, Inc. Membership of these teams is voluntary but admission is tightly controlled. Only approved team members are allowed to elect team leaders and the members of the OSM Board.

In a broad sense, the Joomla project is aligned with WordPress, Drupal and Typo3 to address their concerns with the EU Cyber Resilience Act.

=== Conferences ===
J and Beyond was an annual conference primarily catering to Joomla developers and site integrators. Hosted in Europe typically around May, it served as a key gathering for professionals involved in Joomla-related projects. The 2024 conference was cancelled owing to poor ticket sales.

A number of independently managed local communities of Joomla users and developers exist around the world—referred to as Joomla User Groups [JUGs]—to share news, assist people with problems and organise events. Some of these groups obtain financial support and sponsorship from OSM to conduct events known as JoomlaDays.

=== Financial support ===
Joomla is primarily funded by private sponsorships that offset OSM's operational costs; these costs include taxes, accounting, presence at ground events, operation of domains, and so forth. The project receives the rest of its revenue from website advertising, commissions, examination fees, and Google Summer of Code.

=== Templates ===
There are two types of templates used in the Joomla CMS: frontend templates and backend templates. The frontend template presents the website to the user viewing the content. The backend template presents a panel of controls for website administration. Templates are installed as extensions to Joomla and may be customised with source code overrides and/or CSS. Standard templates are included upon installation while other, third-party templates can be installed later. In general, templates designed for each major version of Joomla are not interoperable with other major versions of Joomla. The following table lists the standard templates installed with each major Joomla release.

Joomla templates by major release
Used in versions	Frontend template	Backend template
1.0	madeyourweb rhuk_solarflare_ii	joomla_admin
1.5	beez ja_purity rhuk_milkyway	khepri
1.6, 1.7 & 2.5	atomic beez_20 beez5	bluestork hathor
3.x	beez3 protostar	hathor isis
4.x, 5.x & 6.x	cassiopeia	atum

=== Extensions ===
Independently of the Joomla development team, other people have created additional software—collectively called extensions—to extend the range of applications that Joomla website owners may require. As with all third-party software products—some of which may be offered free-of-charge or licensed under conditions that may vary from the core Joomla CMS—there can be further complications (e.g incompatibility with higher versions of Joomla). Extensions that were developed for older versions of the Joomla CMS are often a reason why website owners are unable to upgrade their existing CMS to a higher version. The Joomla project does not endorse or recommend extensions created independently of the CMS development team nor does it offer any support for problems that may arise through the use of these products.

There are about 5,000 third-party extensions listed in the Joomla! Extensions Directory.

== See also ==
- Comparison of web frameworks
- List of content management systems
