= Mambo (software) =

Open-source content management system

- Developer: Mambo Foundation Inc.
- Final release: 4.6.5 / June 26, 2008
- Written in: PHP
- Operating system: Cross-platform, PHP-compatible -- Linux preferred
- Type: Content management system
- License: GNU General Public License v2
- Website: web.archive.org/web/20081108004215/http://mambo-foundation.org/

Mambo (formerly named Mambo Open Source or MOS) was a free software/open source content management system (CMS) for creating and managing websites through a simple web interface. Its last release was in 2008, by which time all of the developers had left for forks of the project, mainly Joomla and MiaCMS.

== Features ==
Mambo included features such as page caching to improve performance on busy sites, advanced templating techniques, and a fairly robust API. It could provide RSS feeds and automate many tasks, including web indexing of static pages.

Interface features included printable versions of pages, news flashes, blogs, forums, polls, calendars, website searching, language internationalization, and others.

== Timeline ==
- 2000: Miro Construct Pty Ltd, registered in March 2000 in Melbourne, and headed up by CEO Peter Lamont and Junio Souza Martins, a former advertising executive, starts development of Mambo, a closed-source, proprietary content management system.
- 2001: The company adopted a dual licensing policy, releasing Mambo Site Server under the GPL on SourceForge in April 2001.
- May 2001: The mamboserver.com domain name is registered.
- From this time until the middle of 2002, Miro was the only developer of Mambo, contributing bug-fixes and security patches but not really extending the code or adding to the feature sets.
- 2002: Miro releases the commercial CMS called Mambo 2002.
- With version 3.0.x, the open source Mambo Site Server becomes "Mambo Open Source" (commonly referred to as "MOS").
- Robert Castley becomes Project Director of Mambo Open Source.
- By the end of 2002, Robert Castley had pulled together a volunteer team of developers.
- Mambo Open Source 4.0 is released.
- 2003: Early in 2003, Miro hands off the responsibility of the code fully to the Open Source project Development Team.
- Miro concentrates on its commercial products and Mambo Open Source builds momentum under the leadership of Robert Castley.
- Miro released Mambo CMS, a commercial version of Mambo Open Source. Miro claims that Mambo CMS does not contain any source added to Mambo after it was made open source.
- Miro Construct Pty Ltd goes into voluntary liquidation in February 2003 and in August, Miro International Pty Ltd is formed. Source code for Mambo Open Source shows copyright 2000 - 2003 Miro Construct Pty Ltd.
- Mambo Open Source 4.5 released in December 2003. By this time, almost all of the original Miro code had disappeared during refactoring.
- 2004: mamboforge.net starts in March, 2004.
- Linux Format awards Mambo "Best Free Software Project" of the Year.
- Linux User and Developer names it "Best Linux or Open Source Software".
- In late 2004, Mambo was targeted by legal threats concerning the intellectual property rights to certain pieces of code contained in the core. The problem was severe and cost money, man hours, and eventually the loss of some key community leaders. Miro came to the aid of Mambo, offering legal and corporate resources to protect the development team and preserve the program.
- Robert Castley resigns as Project Director and in November, Andrew Eddie takes on the role.
- December 2004: the Mambo Steering Committee was established with representatives from both Miro and the Mambo development team. This committee was designed to govern the Mambo project.
- January 2005: Andrew Eddie announces a joint venture between Mambo and Miro International Pty Ltd, with Miro proposing to offer financial support for the open source project, plus training, commercial support services, and developer certification.

At the end of January 2005 Junio Souza Martins abandons the project for personal reasons.

- February 2005: Discussions begin over the formation of a non-profit foundation for the Mambo project.
- March 2005: The name "Mambo Open Source" (which was commonly referred to as MOS) was changed to just "Mambo", causing concern in the community over apparent confusion this would cause between the open source, community-developed CMS and Miro's commercial offering, "Mambo CMS".
- April 2005: The commercial Mambo CMS is renamed "Jango".
- "Best Open Source Solution" and "Best of Show - Total Industry Solution" at LinuxWorld Boston.
- "Best Open Source Solution" at LinuxWorld San Francisco.
- July 2005: mambo-foundation.org domain is established.
- August 2005: Mambo Foundation, Inc is legally constituted on 8 August 2005. Miro CEO Peter Lamont appoints himself President of the Board of the new Foundation.
- 12 August: Robert Castley, who is an inaugural member of the Mambo Foundation Board of Regents, states: "The Foundation allows for everything to be placed outside of Miro incl. Domain Names, hosting etc. " and goes on to say that with him, the original founder of Mambo Open Source, and Andrew Eddie both being on the Board of the Mambo Foundation, Mambo would continue as a successful, open source project. He concluded his statement with,"So there you have it: two very key people in the overall success of Mambo are at the helm. Trust me, Mambo is in very, very safe hands!"
- A few days later, the entire team of core programmers publicly announced they had abandoned Mambo and shortly after this, Robert Castley steps down from the Board of Regents.
- The former core development team members regroup under the name "Open Source Matters" and the open source community at mamboserver.com fractures over allegations that the Mambo Foundation was formed without community input and with insufficient developer control. People express suspicion over the level of involvement by Miro International. By the end of August, the new project is named Joomla! and most of the former Mambo community has relocated to Open Source Matters. By the end of September, Open Source Matters Inc is a duly constituted non-profit corporation registered in New York.
- Joomla! positions itself as a "rebranding of Mambo" and releases its first fork of Mambo as Joomla 1.0 in September, 2005. The two code-bases are almost identical at this stage.
- Mambo forms a new core development team with Martin Brampton appointed as Core Development Team leader.
- Miro assigns all rights in the copyright of Mambo to the Mambo Foundation.
- September 2005: Neil Thompson joins the Core Development Team.
- December 2005: Miro International Pty Ltd is voluntarily deregistered as a company from 31 December 2005.
- January 2006: The rights to Miro International Pty Ltd are sold by Peter Lamont and a new business entity called Miro Software Solutions is created. Miro Software Solutions continues to develop Jango and other proprietary software under new ownership.
- March 2006: Mambo named "Best Open Source Software Solution" at LinuxWorld Australia.
- April 2006: Core developer team leader, Martin Brampton, resigns and leaves the project. Chad Auld takes over the role as Core Developer Team leader.
- July 2006: The Mambo Foundation websites become independent from Mambo Communities Pty Ltd.
- Following elections, the new Board of the Mambo Foundation takes office. The Mambo Foundation is now completely independent of any corporate interest.
- April 2007: Mambo 4.6.2 is released. This is a maintenance release for the 4.6.x branch and enables localisation of Mambo.
- January 2008: Mambo 4.5.6 is released. This is the final release of the Mambo 4.5 branch.
- February 2008: Chad Auld leaves the project.
- March 2008: John Messingham becomes Project Leader. Ozgur Cem Sen becomes core development team leader. Ozgur Cem Sen leaves the project shortly thereafter. Andrés Felipe Vargas Valencia is elected Team Leader.
- April 2008: Four former Mambo core developers fork Mambo and form MiaCMS.
- May 2008: Mambo 4.6.4 is released. Codename 'Sunrise', Mambo 4.6.4 is a security and maintenance release that fixes a number of serious security vulnerabilities.
- June 2008: Mambo 4.6.5 is released. Codename 'Jupiter', Mambo 4.6.5 is a security release that fixes a number of serious security vulnerabilities.
- September 2008: Core developer Neil Thompson leaves and joins the MiaCMS core development team. Mambo announces end of life for supporting PHP 4. All future releases will require PHP 5.2 or higher.
- November 2011: Andrés Felipe Vargas noted on the Mambo Foundation's mailing list that the next minor version update was planned to be 4.6.6, followed by a major version release of 4.7.

== See also ==
- List of content management systems
