= PHPDoc =

Documentation format for PHP based on Javadoc

PHPDoc is an adaptation of the Javadoc format for the PHP programming language. It is still an informal standard for commenting PHP code, but in the process of being formalized. It allows external document generators like phpDocumentor, which is the de facto standard implementation, to generate documentation, and it helps some IDEs such as Zend Studio, NetBeans, JetBrains PhpStorm, ActiveState Komodo Edit and IDE, PHPEdit and Aptana Studio to interpret variable types and other ambiguities in the loosely typed language and to provide improved code completion, type hinting and debugging.

PHPDoc supports documentation of both object-oriented and procedural code.

On August 13, 2013 the PHP Framework Interoperability Group began writing a formal specification (PSR) for PHPDoc.

== Example ==
/**
 * Get all image nodes.
 *
 * @param \DOMNode     $node       The \DOMDocument instance
 * @param boolean      $strict     If the document has to be valid
 *
 * @return \DOMNode
 */
 public function getImageNodes(\DOMNode $node, $strict = true): \DOMNode
 {
     // ...
 }

== See also ==
- phpDocumentor
- Doxygen
- Comparison of documentation generators
