= PHP-GTK =

PHP library for GTK+ GUI applications

- Developer: Andrei Zmievski
- Initial release: March 2001; 24 years ago
- Stable release: 2.0.1 / January 15, 2015; 10 years ago
- Operating system: Cross-platform
- Type: Language binding
- License: GNU Lesser General Public License
- Website: gtk.php.net

PHP-GTK is a set of language bindings for the programming language PHP which allow GTK graphical user interface (GUI) applications to be written in PHP. PHP-GTK provides an object-oriented programming interface to GTK classes and functions. PHP-GTK partly supports GTK2, but GTK3 is unsupported.

== History ==
PHP-GTK was originally conceived by Andrei Zmievski, who is also actively involved in the development of PHP and the Zend Engine. The idea was received well by the PHP community, and more people started to get involved with the project. James Moore and Steph Fox were among the first to join in, contributing a great deal to PHP-GTK through their documentation efforts, and Frank Kromann, also from the PHP development team, supplied Windows binaries for the project.

The first version of PHP-GTK was released in March 2001. More people began to get involved, and several extensions were contributed introducing new GUI widgets, such as Scintilla and GtkHTML. PHP-GTK 1.0 was released in October 2003 alongside several extensions, including a wrapper for libglade, which allowed the cross-platform Glade Interface Designer UI builder to be used in creating PHP-GTK applications.

Zmievski and Fox continued to work on the project, with Fox maintaining PHP-GTK for Windows.

In 2008 PHP-GTK 2.0.0 was released to fully use PHP 5.2's powerful object model support, and to bring the improved portability of GTK 2.6, and its new set of widgets. The project also has support for GtkSourceView, which provides a source code editor widget. Around half the classes have been fully documented. Scott Mattocks, a member of the PHP-GTK documentation group, has also written a book on the subject of PHP-GTK programming.

In 2015 PHP-GTK 2.0.1 was released to be compatible with PHP 5.5 and GTK 2.24.

The project is compatible with only GTK 2, not version 3.

WxPHP (WxWidgets for PHP) exists as an alternative to develop GTK PHP applications.

== Example ==
Hello World PHP-GTK

<?php

function pressed()
{
    echo "Hello again - The button was pressed!\n";
}

$window = new GtkWindow();
$button = new GtkButton('Click');
$button1 = new GtkButton('Click');

$window->set_title('Hello World!');
$window->connect_simple('destroy', array('Gtk', 'main_quit'));
$button->connect_simple('clicked', 'pressed');
$button1->connect_simple('clicked', 'pressed');
$window->add($button);
$window->show_all();

Gtk::main();

The sample PHP-GTK 2 program instantiates a GtkWindow widget with the title "Hello World!", containing a GtkButton labelled "Click Me." When the button is pressed, the message "Hello again - The button was pressed!" is displayed on the console via the callback pressed.

== Deployment ==
Several tools have sprung up that assist the simple deployment of PHP-GTK applications. PHP compilers such as PriadoBlender and Roadsend PHP (Currently only compatible with PHP-GTK 1, while latest snapshot includes PHP-GTK 2) enable compiling applications written in PHP-GTK to a standalone binary executable. Alan Knowles' PHP Extension and Application Repository (PEAR) package, bcompiler, also allows compiling PHP into bytecode to hide the source code.

== See also ==
- wxPHP
