= PHP Standard Recommendation =

Specification for the PHP programming language

The PHP Standard Recommendation (PSR) is a PHP specification published by the PHP Framework Interop Group. Similar to Java Specification Request for Java, it serves the standardization of programming concepts in PHP. The aim is to enable interoperability of components and to provide a common technical basis for implementation of proven concepts for optimal programming and testing practices. The PHP-FIG is formed by several PHP frameworks founders.

Each PSR is suggested by members and voted according to an established protocol to act consistently and in line with their agreed upon processes.

Number	Name	Description	Editor	Coordinator	Sponsor	Status
PSR-0	Autoloading Standard	It describes the mandatory requirements that must be adhered to for autoloader interoperability.	N/A	N/A	N/A	Deprecated and substituted by PSR-4
PSR-1	Basic Coding Standard	It comprises what should be considered the standard coding elements that are required to ensure a high level of technical interoperability between shared PHP code.	N/A	N/A	N/A	Accepted
PSR-2	Coding Style Guide	It considers PSR-1 and it is intended to reduce cognitive friction when scanning code from different authors. It does so by enumerating a shared set of rules and expectations about how to format PHP code.	N/A	N/A	N/A	Deprecated
PSR-3	Logger Interface	It describes a common interface for logging libraries.	Jordi Boggiano	N/A	N/A	Accepted
PSR-4	Autoloading Standard	It describes a specification for autoloading classes from file paths. It is fully interoperable, and can be used in addition to any other autoloading specification, including PSR-0. This PSR also describes where to place files that will be auto loaded according to the specification.	Paul M. Jones	Phil Sturgeon	Larry Garfield	Accepted
PSR-5	PHPDoc Standard	The main purpose of this PSR is to provide a complete and formal definition of the PHPDoc standard. This PSR deviates from its predecessor, the de facto PHPDoc Standard associated with phpDocumentor 1.x, to provide support for newer features in the PHP language and to address some of the shortcomings of its predecessor.	Mike van Riel	Phil Sturgeon	Donald Gilbert	Draft
PSR-6	Caching Interface	The goal of this PSR is to allow developers to create cache-aware libraries that can be integrated into existing frameworks and systems without the need for custom development.	Larry Garfield	Paul Dragoonis	Robert Hafner	Accepted
PSR-7	HTTP Message Interface	It describes common interfaces for representing HTTP messages as described in RFC 7230 and RFC 7231, and URIs for use with HTTP messages as described in RFC 3986.	Matthew Weier O'Phinney	Beau Simensen	Paul M. Jones	Accepted
PSR-8	Huggable Interface	It establishes a common way for objects to express mutual appreciation and support by hugging. This allows objects to support each other in a constructive fashion, furthering cooperation between different PHP projects.	Larry Garfield	Cal Evans	Paul M. Jones	Abandoned
PSR-9	Security Disclosure	It gives project leads a clearly defined approach to enabling end users to discover security disclosures using a clearly defined structured format for these disclosures.	Lukas Kahwe Smith	Korvin Szanto	Larry Garfield	Abandoned
PSR-10	Security Advisories	It gives researchers, project leads, upstream project leads and end users a defined and structured process for disclosing security vulnerabilities.	Lukas Kahwe Smith	Larry Garfield	Korvin Szanto	Abandoned
PSR-11	Container Interface	It describes a common interface for dependency injection containers. The goal is to standardize how frameworks and libraries make use of a container to obtain objects and parameters (called entries in the rest of this document).	Matthieu Napoli, David Négrier	Paul M. Jones	Jeremy Lindblom	Accepted
PSR-12	Extended Coding Style Guide	It extends, expands and replaces PSR-2, the coding style guide and requires adherence to PSR-1, the basic coding standard.	Michael Cullum	Korvin Szanto	Alexander Makarov	Accepted
PSR-13	Hypermedia Links	It describes common interfaces for representing a hypermedia link.	Larry Garfield	Matthew Weier O’Phinney	Marc Alexander	Accepted
PSR-14	Event Manager	It describes common interfaces for dispatching and handling events.	Larry Garfield			Accepted
PSR-15	HTTP Server Request Handlers	It describes common interfaces for HTTP server request handlers and HTTP server middleware components that use HTTP messages.	Woody Gilk		Matthew Weier O’Phinney	Accepted
PSR-16	Simple Cache	It describes a simple yet extensible interface for a cache item and a cache driver.	Paul Dragoonis	Jordi Boggiano	Fabien Potencier	Accepted
PSR-17	HTTP Factories	It describes a common standard for factories that create PSR-7 compliant HTTP objects.	Woody Gilk		Matthew Weier O’Phinney	Accepted
PSR-18	HTTP Client	It describes a common interface for sending HTTP requests and receiving HTTP responses.	Tobias Nyholm		Sara Golemon	Accepted
PSR-19	PHPDoc tags	It provides a complete catalog of tags in the PHPDoc standard.	Chuck Burgess			Draft
PSR-20	Clock	It provides a standard way of accessing the clock - allowing interopability during testing, when testing behavior that has timing based side effects.	Chris Seufert		Chuck Burgess	Accepted
PSR-21	Internationalization	TBD.	Navarr Barnier			Draft
PSR-22	Application Tracing	TBD.	Adam Allport			Draft

The PHP-FIG official website has the PSR documentation that follows the RFC 2119 written by Scott Bradner in March 1997 at Harvard University.
