= FlyEnv =

- Available in: English,
- Website: Official website

FlyEnv, formerly known as PhpWebStudy, is a cross-platform, local web development environment management tool designed for developers on macOS, Microsoft Windows , and Linux. It serves as a lightweight and modular alternative to container-based solutions like Docker and solution stacks such as XAMPP or MAMP.

== Overview ==
FlyEnv operates by running services as native static binaries rather than through virtualization. This approach allows for faster I/O performance, instant startup times, and significantly lower RAM and battery consumption compared to Docker Desktop. It is designed to be "modular," allowing users to install only the specific runtimes and services required for their projects.

== Features ==
- Broad Stack Support: Out-of-the-box support for a wide range of programming languages including PHP (with version switching from 7.4 to 8.x), Node.js, Python, Java, Go, Ruby, Rust, Bun, and Deno.
- Web Servers & Databases: One-click installation and management for Caddy, Nginx, and Apache HTTP Server, and Apache Tomcat, as well as databases like MySQL, MariaDB, PostgreSQL, MongoDB, and Redis.

Networking Tools:

- Local DNS Server: Allows developers to assign custom domains (e.g., .test or .localhost) to projects without manually editing the system hosts file.
- Automated SSL: Automatically generates and manages trusted SSL certificates for local HTTPS development.
- Email Testing: Integrated Mailpit service to capture and view outgoing emails locally.
- Project Isolation: Supports running different versions of the same language simultaneously on different ports, ensuring that legacy and modern projects can coexist on the same machine.
- Modern Integrations: Recent versions have added support for AI tools like Ollama and DeepSeek, and container management via Podman for workflows that still require containerization.

== Architecture ==
Unlike traditional installers that modify global system paths, FlyEnv is designed to be non-intrusive. It manages environment variables through a GUI, allowing users to set up paths for specific terminal sessions or globally.

== Distribution ==
FlyEnv is developed by a Chinese developer, Alex Xu (Chinese: 徐鹏飞), as an open-source software project in 2019 , written in Vue.js and is maintained primarily through his own effort, despite its growing popularity in the global developer community contribution through GitHub.

It offers a freemium model where core features are free, and additional pro features or tools (such as batch image processing or advanced screen capture) are available via licensing.
