= Guzzle (PHP library) =

Guzzle is an HTTP client library for PHP. Initially a wrapper library around cURL, it evolved to a transport agnostic PSR-7 compatible library.

It is shipped on Packagist as a Composer package, where it is used by 4,905 PHP libraries, frameworks or applications.
