= GetSimple CMS =

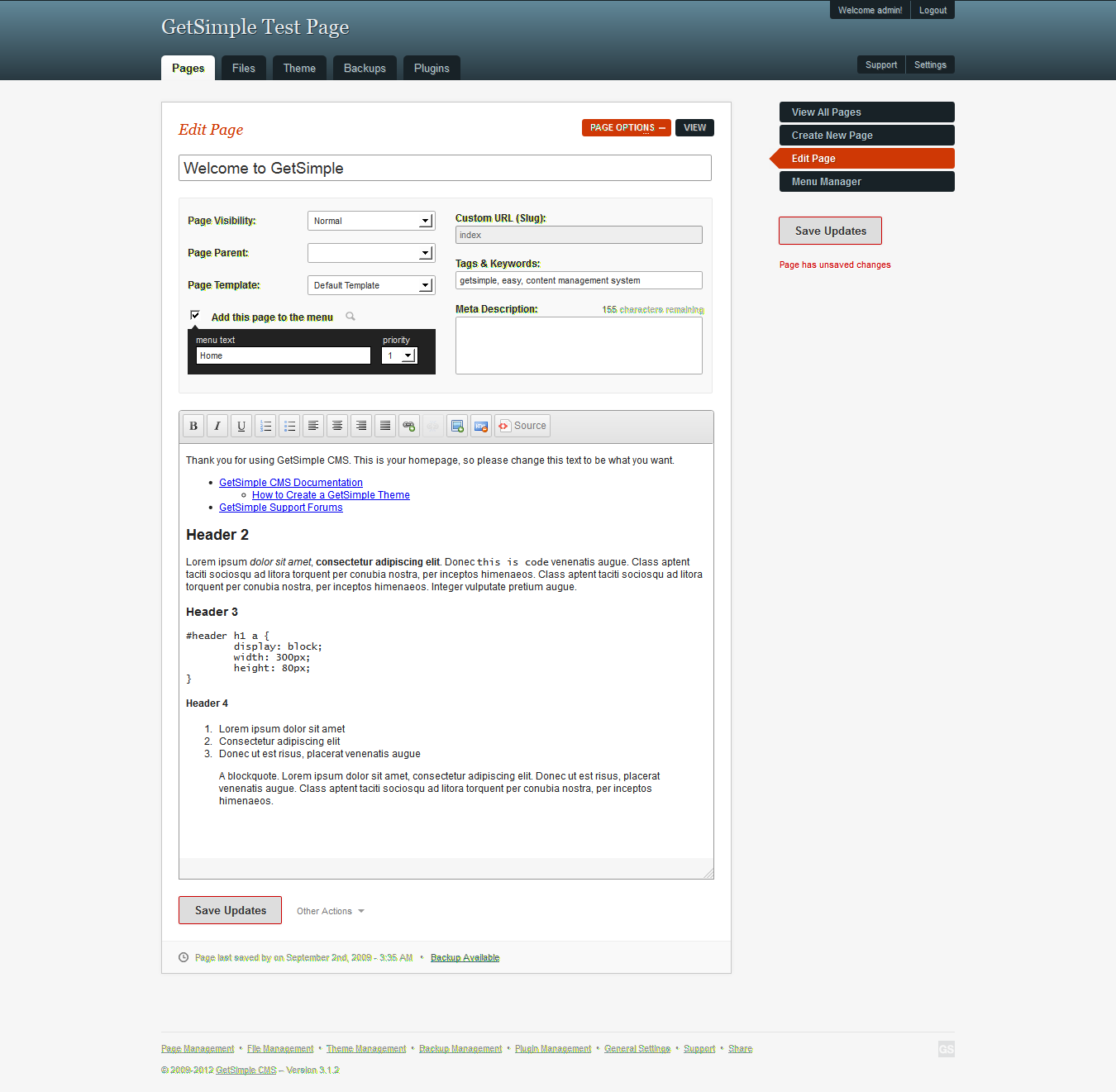
- Screenshot of a demo installation
- Original authors: Chris Cagle, GetSimple Team
- Stable release: 3.3.16 / 3 March 2020
- Written in: PHP
- Operating system: Cross-platform
- Type: Web content management system
- License: GPL
- Website: getsimple-ce.ovh (Community Edition)

GetSimple CMS is a free web Content Management System with the primary goal to be simple and easy to use. It is based on the programming language PHP and uses XML files to store the content. It is a flat file Content Management System, in contrast to other CMS software, that tend to use databases such as MySQL.

== History ==
GetSimple CMS was created in 2009 by the resident in Pittsburgh, PA in the US web developer Chris Cagle, who still presides over the project as a senior developer. Cage claims he created GetSimple CMS out of the need of a CMS that is "as powerful as WordPress is to use", but easier. Since then, other developers have joined the GetSimple team. An active community contributes plug-ins, translations and themes.

Since November 2024, the official website is not supported.

== Description ==
GetSimple CMS was primarily developed for the creation of smaller websites, however it is also suitable for medium to large websites thanks to the extendability of the platform via plug-ins and themes. The target groups of the CMS are organizations, companies and individuals who need a small to medium-sized websites. According to statistics from W3Tech, GetSimple CMS is used by less than 0.1% of all sites on the internet.

A simple installation process (copying the files to the web server and start the installation routine) allows the immediate use of the software. Some web hosts offer the CMS already pre-installed. Once installed, the software can be expanded with numerous plug-ins and themes.

== Reception ==
GetSimple CMS has been downloaded over 120,000 times (as of March 2013). The magazine t3n assigns GetSimple as "micro" and "Minimal-CMS" one, praises the simplicity yet possible extensibility through plug-ins. The author of the article states that the theming concept of GetSimple belong to the most intuitive that he had ever seen. The British magazine Computer Active raises the backup function and the simplicity and cleanliness of the work surface as well as the supplied templates produced. The Content Manager magazine dedicated to the CMS a detailed presentation and took it in 2012 next to TYPO3 and WordPress in a comparison of 15 open source CMS on. Hot Scripts counted the CMS in May 2010 to the ten easiest and lightest weight scripts on the web, Design Shack counts it among 50 WordPress alternatives ranks eighth on. On the on Demo specialized installations Page OpenSourceCMS.com counted GetSimple to the 30 most common and best-rated systems (Stand 2013 ).

On November 22nd 2024 the site seems to be hacked and on the official forum the post of moderator Timbow on November 23rd states: "I see that http://get-simple.info/ has been hacked. I have no idea who has access to the domain or hosting and if I had their name no idea how to contact them. The site is not likely to be unhacked ever now. As far as I can tell I am the last of the old crew and I only ever had moderator rights on the forum. A week or two past there were disk space errors on the forums and I don't know if or how they were resolved. Best copy anything you might need now. It's been great".

== GetSimple CMS Community Edition ==
Since 2022, a version of Get Simple Community Edition (CE) has been developed by users known by the pseudonyms Multicolor and Islander. This edition aims to introduce a range of improvements, including support for modern PHP versions, and is continuously maintained with new features that are not available in the standard version upon installation. In 2023, the website GetSimple CMS CE Website was launched to inform users about updates and serve as a platform where the latest version of this software can be downloaded.
