= MCVE =

MCVE is a credit card processing computer software library and interface running under the Red Hat operating system, replacing Red Hat's CCVS. It was built in to some older versions of PHP.

In November 2001, Main Street Softworks signed a contract with Red Hat to migrate the existing CCVS clientele to use MCVE. On July 2, 2003, Main Street Softworks renamed MCVE to Monetra. The following day a new version of MCVE was released carrying the new name, Monetra. Since then, they have released several new versions of Monetra and were in version 7 as of December 2011.
