= Neo (Italian band) =

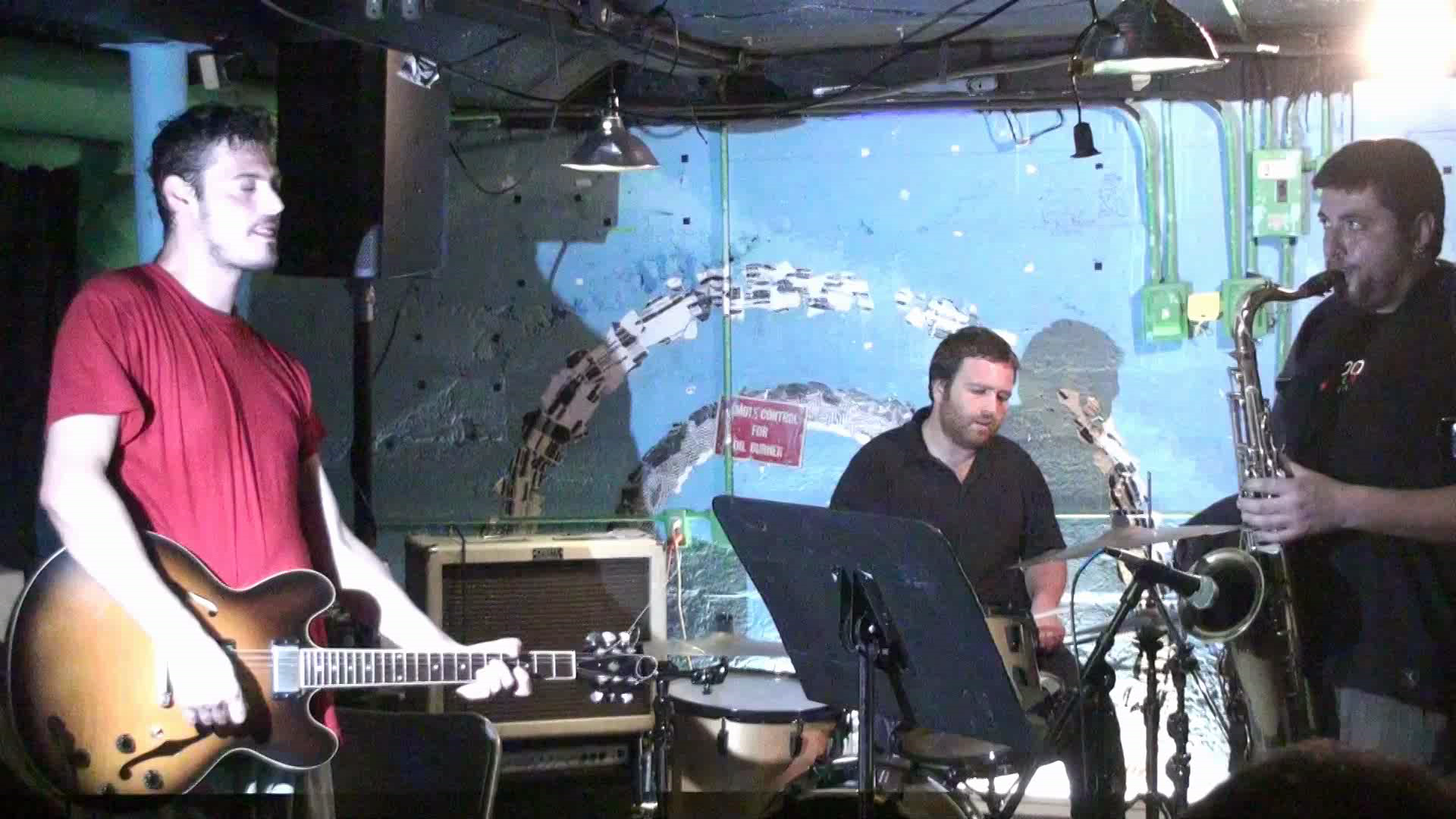
- Neo at the Silent Barn in New York City in 2010.

Background information
- Origin: Terracina, Lazio, Italy
- Genres: Progressive rock; jazz; jazz fusion; avant-prog; experimental rock; noise rock
- Years active: 2001–present
- Labels: fromScratch, Megasound
- Members: Manlio Maresca; Antonio Zitarelli; Carlo Conti
- Past members: Fabrizio Giovanpietro

Neo are a jazz and progressive rock band from Italy formed in 2001. They have received many positive reviews in the press, and their next album is being produced by Steve Albini.

== Members ==
- Antonio Zitarelli - drums
- Carlo Conti - saxophone
- Manlio Maresca - guitar

=== Past members ===
- Fabrizio Giovanpietro - bass

== Discography ==
- 2005 - La quinta essenza della mediocrità
- 2009 - Water Resistance
- 2011 - Neoclassico
