= Neo (French law enforcement agencies mobile terminals) =

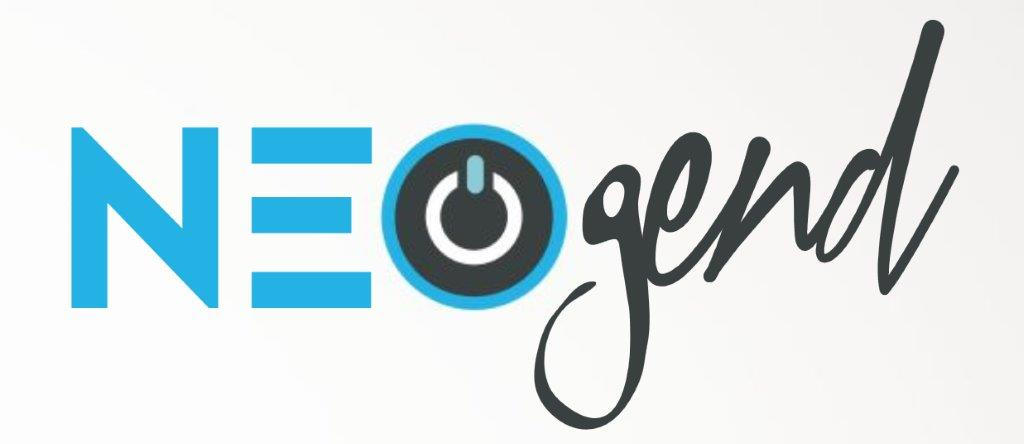

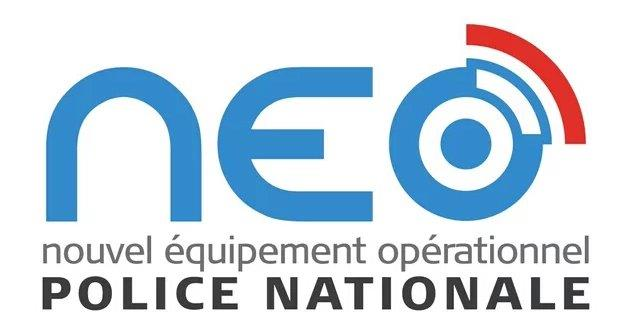
- Developers: Agence nationale de la sécurité des systèmes d'information & Service for technologies and information systems of homeland security

NEO is a project aimed to provide French police officers and gendarmes with mobile terminals with a secure broadband connection. It is based on a version of Android developed by the national agency of the security of the information systems (ANSSI) with the support of the service for technologies and information systems of homeland security (ST[SI]²). NEO stands for new operational equipment. The gendarmerie uses the acronym NeoGend to designate this terminal.

== History ==
The project to create a modern tool for mobile police and gendarmerie forces began in 2014. Its outcome will occur in 2017 with the distribution of the mobile devices throughout the national territory.

Here is a summary of the different stages of the project :

- September 2014: launch of the project
- October 2014: creation of the steering committee between the different development actors
- Fall 2014: definition of the first applications to integrate, choice of the secured android solution Secdroid
- December 2014: selection of the gendarmerie group of the department of the Nord and the departmental public security department of Seine-et-Marne to experiment the tool
- June 2015: first smartphones and tablets distributed in experimental sites
- September to November 2015: distribution of 1650 devices in the department of Nord and Seine-et-Marne and choice of the Burgundy region and the Seine-Maritime for a second phase of tests
- March to June 2016: distribution of 3,500 equipment in Burgundy-Franche-Comté and Seine-Maritime.
- September 2016: distribution in the gendarmerie units at the national level of a collective equipment (6000 devices)
- End of 2016: distribution of 10000 collective and individual devices at the national level
- September 2017: planned deployment to all police and gendarmerie forces (90 000 devices)

== Technical platform ==
The device work under an Android platform was modified to include a VPN linked to two electronic certificates: one for the device and the other for the user. This makes it possible to secure communications and to keep track of the actions performed by each user.

In terms of connectivity, these devices can use conventional operated networks but also specific networks of security forces based on Tetrapol with a Bluetooth connexion.
