= Composer (software) =

Software; application level dependency manager for the PHP programming language

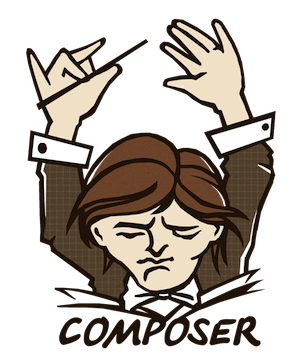
- Developers: Nils Adermann, Jordi Boggiano
- Release: March 1, 2012; 14 years ago
- Stable release: 2.11.2 / 10 November 2026; 2 days ago
- Written in: PHP
- Operating system: Cross-platform
- Type: Package manager
- License: MIT License
- Website: getcomposer.org
- Repository: github.com/composer/composer

Composer is an application-level dependency manager for the PHP programming language that provides a standard format for managing dependencies of PHP software and required libraries. It was developed by Nils Adermann and Jordi Boggiano, who continue to manage the project. They began development in April 2011 and first released it on March 1, 2012. Composer is strongly inspired by Node.js's "npm" and Ruby's "bundler". The project's dependency solving algorithm started out as a PHP-based port of openSUSE's libzypp SAT solver.

Composer runs from the command line and installs dependencies (e.g. libraries) for an application. It also allows users to install PHP applications that are available on "Packagist" which is its main repository containing available packages. It also provides autoload capabilities for libraries that specify autoload information to ease usage of third-party code.

== Supported frameworks ==
- Symfony version 2 and later
- Laravel version 5 and later
- CodeIgniter version 3.0 and later
- CakePHP version 3.0 and later
- FuelPHP version 2.0 and later
- Drupal version 8 and later
- TYPO3 version 6.2 and later
- Neos Flow version 2.0 and later
- Magento version 2.0 later
- OpenMage version 20.0.0 and later
- Yii version 1.1 and later
- Laminas
- Silex (web framework)
- Lumen (web framework)
- Adianti Framework version 1 and later

== See also ==
- List of PHP software and tools
- PEAR
