= Neo (given name) =

Neo is a given name of the following notable people:

- Chua Jim Neo (1905–1980), Singaporean chef and cookbook writer
- Gen Neo (born 1989), Singaporean singer-songwriter, producer and composer
- Neo Maema (born 1995), South African football midfielder
- Neo Makama (born 1981), Mosotho football striker
- Neo Masisi, First Lady of Botswana
- Neo Masithela (born 1966), South African politician and businessman
- Neo Moroka, politician and businessman in Botswana
- Neo Mothiba (born 1982), South African basketball player
- Neo Ntsoma (born 1972), South African photographer
- Neo Rauch (born 1960), German artist
- Neo Sora (born 1991), American film director and screenwriter
- Neo Yau (born 1990), Hong Kong-based actor
