= Rapid PHP Editor =

rapid PHP Editor
- Developer: Blumentals Solutions SIA
- Stable release: 12
- Operating system: Microsoft Windows
- Type: IDE
- License: Proprietary
- Website: Official Website

rapid PHP Editor is a PHP editor that incorporates many functions such as [[[Autocomplete]], syntax checker, debugger and many other tools for fast PHP development.

Rapid PHP Editor also contain other development tools for helping on HTML, CSS, JavaScript and many other languages.

Is part of a family of products covering most aspects of modern web development integrating as well many other capabilities used by developers.

Some features:

- (X)HTML to HTML5
- CSS to CSS3
- Code intelligence
- Powerful search and replace
- Support for several frameworks
- Code beautifier
- FTP Explorer (FTP/SFTP/FTPS)
- File explorer
- Database explorer
- Code snippets
- Validators and Debuggers
- FAST, real fast
- Many other tools available (many more to describe all here)

== History ==
Rapid PHP Editor was built using the Delphi programming language.
