= PHPEdit =

Integrated development environment

- PHPEdit IDE
- Developer: WaterProof
- Initial release: 1999; 27 years ago
- Stable release: 4.3.3 (May 29, 2012; 13 years ago) [±]
- Preview release: 5.0 (May 31, 2012; 13 years ago) [±]
- Written in: Delphi
- Operating system: Windows
- Type: IDE
- License: Proprietary
- Website: phpedit.com

PHPEdit was a commercial IDE developed by the French company WaterProof SARL. It ran on the Microsoft Windows operating system, and was designed mainly for the PHP language, but supported many other languages such as CSS, HTML, JavaScript, INI, PHPEditScript, PlainText, SQL, XML, and XSLT.

As of August 2017, both PHPEdit and Waterproof websites are dead; product status is unknown.

== Features ==
- Syntax highlighting for multiple languages in one document. Supported languages are CSS, HTML, JavaScript, INI, PHPEditScript, PHP, PlainText, SQL, XML, and XSLT
- Code Hint for HTML, SQL and PHP
- Code Insight for HTML, SQL and PHP
- Code beautifier
- Integrated PHP debugger
- Automatic syntax checking
- Help generator
- Task Reporter
- Customizable shortcuts
- More than 150 scriptable commands
- Keyboard templates
- To-do report generator
- QuickMarks
- File Explorer
- FTP Explorer
- EZ Publish integration
- CVS and SVN integration
- Solution Explorer
- Database Explorer
- Code browser
- Visual Query Builder
- Project Manager
- Plugins
- Integrated help manuals
- PHPUnit integration

== History ==
PHPEdit development started as personal project of Sébastien Hordeaux in 1999. Distributed freely over the Internet, the project's community grew to more than 200,000 users. During this period of growth, Sébastien met John Knipper, Bertrand Dunogier and Daniel Lucazeau. In April 2004 they helped him create WaterProof SARL.

In July 2004, the first commercial version of the IDE was sold and since, hundreds of companies have adopted PHPEdit as their main development environment for PHP.

In November 2004, Bastien Hofmann joined the company to speed up PHPEdit development.

In April 2005, Jean Roussel joined the company to reinforce the PHP development department and develop a new solution called wIT, a PHP-based issue tracker.

== Version history ==
Major version	Minor version	Release date	Changes
Beta versions	0.1-0.7	1999-2001	First freeware beta versions
Beta versions	0.8	September 2003	Last freeware version
Version 1	1.0	June 2004	First commercial release
Version 1	1.2	April 2005	Automatic syntax checking; phpDocumentor support; eZ publish support.
Version 2	2.0	January 2006	Project management.
Version 2	2.2	15 April 2006	CVS and Subversion support.
Version 2	2.4	7 June 2006	FTP and SFTP support.
Version 2	2.6	19 August 2006	Unicode files editing.
Version 2	2.8	December 2006	MySQL explorer and visual query designer.
Version 2	2.10	April 2007	Xdebug support for debugging PHP.
Version 2	2.12	June 2007	Unit tests using PHPUnit.
Version 3	3.0	18 September 2008	Complete rewrite. Code folding; smart indenting; improved unicode support.
Version 3	3.2	20 March 2009	Symfony framework support as a plugin.
Version 3	3.4	8 June 2009	Support for PHP native classes; improved project management.
Version 3	3.6	26 February 2010	Automatic updates; PHP 5.3 support.
Version 4	4.0	18 February 2011	Contextual interface; extensibility by PHP scripting; breadcrumb navigator.
Version 4	4.1	29 September 2011	CSS support.
Version 4	4.2	23 November 2011	New code navigation tools.
Version 4	4.3	19 March 2012	PHP 5.4 and HTML 5 support.
Version 5	5.0 beta	31 May 2011	Improved JavaScript and HTML support, ApiGen support.
Version 5	5.0	3 July 2013	JavaScript support, HTML improvements, Code Insight improvements, Help generator and Task report
