= PhpDocumentor =

Open-source documentation generator written in PHP

phpDocumentor
- phpDocumentor
- Stable release: 3.4.3 / October 24, 2023; 2 years ago
- Written in: PHP
- Platform: Web application
- Type: Documentation generator
- License: MIT License
- Website: phpdoc.org

phpDocumentor is an open-source documentation generator written in PHP. It automatically parses PHP source code and produces readable API and source code documentation, based on PHPDoc-formatted comments and the structure of the source code itself. It supports documentation of both object-oriented and procedural code. phpDocumentor runs at the command line to create documentation in HTML format. It has support for linking between documentation, incorporating user level documents like tutorials, and creation of highlighted source code with cross referencing to PHP general documentation.

phpDocumentor 1.x could parse PHP syntax of PHP 4 up to PHP 5.2.

In March 2012, the DocBlox project merged with the 1.x branch of phpDocumentor, resulting in the new major version release of phpDocumentor 2. The first alpha was released on March 16, 2012. phpDocumentor 2.x supported syntax for PHP 5.3 up to 7.0.

The 3.0 major version release occurred on October 27, 2020. This brought PHP syntax readability up to 7.4.

== See also ==
- Comparison of documentation generators
- PHPDoc standard for commenting PHP code
