= SimpleXML =

SimpleXML is a PHP extension that allows users to easily manipulate/use XML data. It was introduced in PHP 5 as an object oriented approach to the XML DOM providing an object that can be processed with normal property selectors and array iterators. It represents an easy way of getting an element's attributes and textual content if you know the XML document's structure or layout.

Compared to DOM or the Expat parser, SimpleXML takes a fewer lines of code to read text data from an element.

== Functions ==
- addAttribute()
- addChild()
- asXML()
- attributes()
- children()
- __construct()
- getDocNamespaces()
- getName()
- getNamespaces()
- registerXPathNamespace()
- xpath()
- simplexml_import_dom
- simplexml_load_file
- simplexml_load_string

== Error handling ==
It is possible to suppress all XML errors when loading the document and then iterate over the errors.
