= TYPO3 =

Web content management framework

- Logo of TYPO3

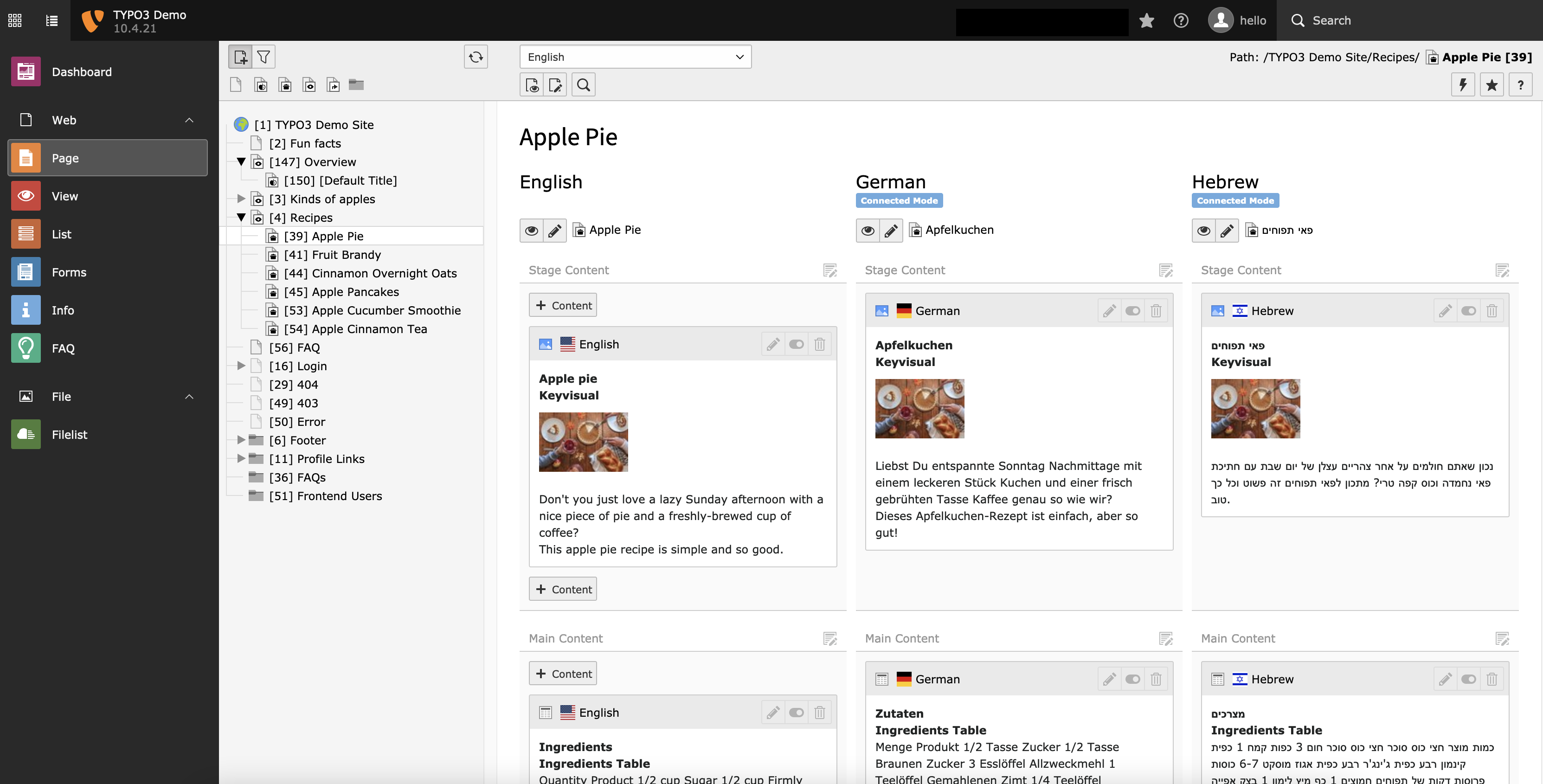
- TYPO3 CMS 10.4 back end
- Original author: Kasper Skårhøj
- Developer: TYPO3 Association
- Release: 1998; 28 years ago
- Stable release: 14.3.2 / 2026-05-26; 2 months ago
- Written in: PHP, SQL, JavaScript
- Operating system: Windows, Linux, FreeBSD, macOS, OS/2
- Platform: IA-32, x86-64
- Size: 18.5 MB
- Available in: 51 languages
- Type: Content management framework, content management system
- License: GNU General Public License version 2
- Website: typo3.org
- Repository: git.typo3.org/Packages/TYPO3.CMS.git

TYPO3 is a web content management system (CMS) written in the programming language PHP. It is free and open-source software released under the GNU General Public License version 2.

TYPO3 is similar to other content management systems such as Drupal, Joomla!, and WordPress. It is used more widely in Europe than in other regions, with a larger market share in German-speaking countries, the Netherlands, and France.

TYPO3 was acknowledged as a Digital Public Good by the Digital Public Goods Alliance in April of 2025.

TYPO3 allows for the separate maintenance of code and content. It can be extended with new functions without writing any program code. TYPO3 supports publishing content in multiple languages due to its built-in localization system.

== History and usage ==
TYPO3 was initially authored by Kasper Skårhøj in 1997. It is now developed by over 300 contributors under the lead of Benjamin Mack.

Calculations from the TYPO3 Association show that it is currently used in more than 500,000 installations. The number of installations detected by the public website "CMS Crawler" was around 384,000 in February 2017.

== Features ==
TYPO3 provides a base set of interfaces, functions and modules. Most functionality exceeding the base set can be implemented via the use of extensions. More than 5000 extensions are currently available for TYPO3 for download under the GNU General Public License from a repository called the TYPO3 Extension Repository, or TER.

=== Compatibility ===
TYPO3 is able to run on most HTTP servers such as Apache, Nginx and IIS on top of Linux, Microsoft Windows, FreeBSD, macOS, and OS/2. It uses PHP 7.2 or newer and any relational database supported by the TYPO3 DBAL including MySQL/MariaDB, PostgreSQL, and SQLite. Some 3rd-party extensions – not using the database API – support MySQL as the only database engine. The system can be run on any web server with at least 256 MB RAM and a CPU appropriate for that RAM.

The back end can be displayed in any modern browser with JavaScript. There is no browser restriction for displaying user-oriented content generated by TYPO3. A developer setting up a website with TYPO3 would need to work intensively with the Domain-specific language Typoscript.

=== System architecture ===
Conceptually, TYPO3 consists of two parts: the front end, visible to visitors, and the administrative back end. The front end displays the web content. The back end is responsible for administration and managing content. The core functions of TYPO3 include user privileges and user roles, timed display control of content (show/hide content elements), a search function for static and dynamic content, search-engine friendly URLs, an automatic sitemap, multi-language capability for front and back ends, and more.

Like most modern CMS's, TYPO3 follows the policy of separation of content and layout: The website content is stored in a relational database, while the page templates are stored on the file system. Therefore, both can be managed and updated separately.

TYPO3 defines various basic types of content data. Standard content elements are described as text, text with media, images, (plain) HTML, video etc. Various added types of content elements can be handled using extensions.

The fundamental content unit is a "page". Pages represent a URL in the front end and are organized hierarchically in the back end's page tree. Standard pages serve as "containers" for one or multiple content elements. There are several added special page types, including:

- shortcuts (they show content from another page)
- mount points (that insert a part of the page tree at the mount point)
- external URLs
- system folders (to handle complex data such as registered users)

Internally, TYPO3 is managed by various PHP arrays. They contain all the information necessary to generate HTML code from the content stored in the database. This is achieved by a unique configuration language called Typoscript.

==== Design elements ====
Designing and developing with TYPO3 is commonly based on the following elements, among others:

Page tree
Representation of all pages of a site, their structure and properties.
Constants
System-wide configuration parameters
Template
Since TYPO3 6, the system runs on the templating engine Fluid. Fluid combines HTML markup with conditions and control structures. It can be extended by custom view helpers written in PHP.

Until version 4.3, an HTML skeleton was used, with markers (e.g., ###MARKER###) and range markers, called subparts (e.g., <!-- ###CONTENT### Start --> … <!-- ###CONTENT### End -->); that were replaced by various content elements or served as a sub template. This template system can still be found in older extensions or installations.

Typoscript
Typoscript is a purely declarative configuration language. In Typoscript, configuration values are defined, which are parsed into a system-wide PHP array. Typoscript is object-based and organized in a tree-like structure.
Extensions
Added plug-ins to enable more functions. See Extensions.
PHP
TYPO3 CMS is written in PHP. Thus, most features can be modified or extended by experienced users. For example, the XCLASS mechanism allows classes and methods to be overwritten and extended.

=== Extensions ===
Extensions are the cornerstone in the internal architecture of TYPO3. A feature that was introduced with version 3.5 in 2003 is the Extension Manager, a control center managing all TYPO3 extensions. The division between the TYPO3 core and the extensions is an important concept which determined the development of TYPO3 in the past years. Extensions are designed in a way so they can supplement the core seamlessly. This means that a TYPO3 system will appear as a unit while actually being composed of the core application and a set of extensions providing various features.

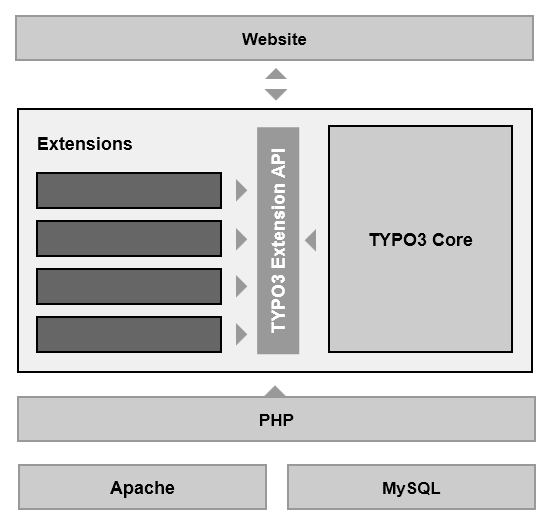
Diagram of the basic TYPO3 system architecture

They can be downloaded from the online repository (TER) directly from the back end, and are installed and updated with a few clicks. Every extension is identified by a unique extension key (for example, tt news). Also, developers can share new or modified extensions by uploading them to the repository.

Generally, extensions are written in PHP. The full command set of PHP 5.3 can be used (regarded the system requirements of the specific TYPO3 version), but TYPO3 also provides several library classes for better efficiency: Best known and most used is the Pibase library class. With introduction of TYPO3 4.3 in 2009, Pibase has been replaced (or extended) by the Extbase library, which is a modern, model–view–controller (MVC) based development framework. To ensure backward compatibility, both libraries can be used in the same TYPO3 installation. Extbase is a backport of some features of FLOW3, renamed Neos Flow, a general web application framework.

== Notable projects ==
Several companies and organizations base their web or intranet sites on TYPO3. The majority are based in German-speaking countries, such as the state of Saxony-Anhalt, the German Green Party, the University of Lucerne (Switzerland), the University of Vienna (Austria) and Technische Universität Berlin. International organizations running one or more TYPO3 sites are: Airbus, Konica-Minolta, Leica Microsystems, Air France, Greenpeace, and Meda (Sweden).

== Releases ==
=== Version history ===
Legend:
Unsupported
Supported
Latest version
Future version

Branch	Version	Release date	Major changes
3.x
3.x	3.0	2001	First public release
3.x	3.2	17 May 2002	Several bug fixes
3.x	3.3	3 June 2002	Several bug fixes; First version hosted on SourceForge
3.x	3.5	18 February 2003	Several bug fixes; Introduced the Extension Manager, allowing users to write their own extension modules
3.x	3.6	30 April 2004	Create Extensible Hypertext Markup Language (XHTML) code in standard content elements; XML storage for content elements; Introduced basic database abstraction concept
3.x	3.7	24 September 2004	Simplified content-localisation; Extended permission system; Renewed TypoScript-Engine
3.x	3.8	23 May 2005	Multi-language ability for the back end (introduced language packs); GraphicsMagick support; Improved front-end search
3.x	3.8.1	14 November 2005	Several bug fixes and security improvements
4.x	4.0	7 April 2006	Back-end redesign for better user experience; Restructured HTML output; Introduced back-end skins and the new rich text editor; Introduced workspaces (integrated versioning); Implementation of a database abstraction layer; Enabled TYPO3 to work on Oracle and PostgreSQL; Current Version: 4.0.13
4.x	4.1	6 March 2007	Improved page tree with Ajax; Introduced Inline Relational Record Editing (IRRE); Improved UTF-8 support and enabling of InnoDB features; Current version: 4.1.15
4.x	4.2	24 May 2008	Many GUI improvements in the back end, including AJAX features, extended features of the text editor; Improvement of front-end login and extension update process; Current version: 4.2.17
4.x	4.3	30 November 2009	Modified front-end editing; Flash uploader and recycle bin for the back end; New system reports & system scheduler; Introduced the new caching framework; Security improvements with Salt (cryptography) & RSA; Integration of Extbase & Fluid features; Current version: 4.3.14
4.x	4.4	22 June 2010	Full back-end redesign incl. performance improvements; Simplified installation, first Introduction Package – a complete website template; CSS and JavaScript compression, HTML5 support in the front end; Current version: 4.4.15
4.x	4.5 LTS	26 January 2011	First release with long-term support (LTS), until March 2015, incl. support of IE6; Extended long-term support (chargeable), until March 2016; UTF-8 as default character set and HTML5 in back end; Refurbished back-end forms and extension manager; Integrated protection against CSRF; Current version: 4.5.40
4.x	4.6	25 October 2011	Internationalization with XLIFF; New website form content element; Security & performance improvements; Current version: 4.6.15
4.x	4.7	24 April 2012	Complete accessibility for new installations acc. to WCAG; Introduced new HTML5 elements like <audio> & <video>, improvements for TCEforms; Introduced the Government Package; Current version: 4.7.19
6.x	6.0	27 November 2012	Integration of a file abstraction layer (FAL); Drag & Drop in the Page Module; Support for IPv6; Standardized bootstrap for mount points; Latest version: 6.0.14
6.x	6.1	30 April 2013	Automatic updates for the Core and for translations, e.a.; Latest version: 6.1.11
6.x	6.2 LTS	25 March 2014	Second release with Long Term Support (LTS), until April 2017; File Abstraction Layer (FAL) re-worked; Install Tool re-written and Distribution Management added; Responsive image rendering and mobile device preview; New documentation module added; Enhanced security features; Latest version: 6.2.47
7.x	7.0	2 December 2014	General code clean-up, speed improvements through outsourcing of an old compatibility layer, refresh of the visual appearance of the back end
7.x	7.4	4 August 2015	Backend Overhaul Vol 2
7.x	7.5	29 September 2015	general code base improvements, Backend Overhaul Vol 3
7.x	7.6 LTS	10 November 2015	Third release with Long Term Support (LTS), support until November 2018
8.x	8.0	22 March 2016	General code cleanup, speed improvements through outsourcing of the old compatibility layer, refresh of the visual appearance of the back end. Usage of performance improvements through PHP7 requirement.
8.x	8.1	3 May 2016	Most notable: Doctrine integration, UX rework of workspace module, general cleanup
8.x	8.2	5 July 2016	Ogg, FLAC and Opus media support; Removed support for compatibility6 extension
8.x	8.3	30 August 2016	Doctrine DBAL migration; Tree rendering with SVGs; Unified linking syntax; PHP 7.1 support
8.x	8.4	18 October 2016	Mobile back end; Documentation API; Easier migrations; Access flexform values by TypoScript
8.x	8.5	20 December 2016	New form framework, Integration of CKEditor
8.x	8.6	14 February 2017	Improvements in front-end editing
8.x	8.7 LTS	4 April 2017	Long Term Support Release (LTS), bug fixes for 18 months, security support for 36 months, until March 2020
9.x	9.0	12 December 2017	First of five sprint releases to 9.x LTS. Refactored Install Tool into System Maintenance Area. New Page Tree user interface. New page translations
9.x	9.1	30 January 2018	Custom handling of URL redirects
9.x	9.2	10 April 2018	New Site module for configuring separate websites and languages in a multi-site project
9.x	9.3	12 June 2018	Additional SEO extension
9.x	9.4	4 September 2018	URL Routing for pages "Speaking URLs for Routing", XML Sitemap
9.x	9.5 LTS	2 October 2018	Long Term Support Release (LTS), bug fixes for 18 months, security support for 36 months, until September 2021
10.x	10.0	23 July 2019	
10.x	10.1	1 October 2019	
10.x	10.2	3 December 2019	
10.x	10.3	25 February 2020	
10.x	10.4 LTS	21 April 2020	Long Term Support Release (LTS), fully supported for 1.5 years, security and critical fixes until April 2023
11.x	11.0	22 December 2020	Support PHP 7.4 and 8.0 / MySQL 5.7+ / MariaDB / Postgres / SQLite
11.x	11.1	23 February 2021	
11.x	11.2	4 May 2021	
11.x	11.3	13 July 2021	
11.x	11.4	7 September 2021	
11.x	11.5	5 October 2021	Long Term Support Release (LTS), fully supported for three years until October 2024
12.x	12.0	4 October 2022	First release of TYPO3 12.0
12.x	12.1	6 December 2022	Interoperability with third-party systems
12.x	12.2	7 February 2023	Improved Back-end UI
12.x	12.3	28 March 2023	Last-Minute Features
12.x	12.4	25 April 2023	Long Term Support Version with 3 years of official security and maintenance support
13.x	13.0	30 January 2024	First release of TYPO3 13.0 with breaking changes and new system requirements
13.x	13.1	23 April 2024	Reusable components for creating new sites
13.x	13.2	2 July 2024	Content blocks and new APIs for integrations
13.x	13.3	17 September 2024	Feature freeze
13.x	13.4	15 October 2024	LTS release
14.x	14.0	25 October 2025	First release of TYPO3 14.0 with breaking changes, the start of new backend styling, wizard for editors
14.x	14.1	20 January 2026	A default frontend theme, QR code module and more backend improvements
14.x	14.2	31 March 2026	In context editing, short URL module, mail form improvements
14.x	14.3	21 April 2026	LTS release

=== Neos ===
A completely rewritten version (code-named "Phoenix") was originally planned as TYPO3 version 5.0. While working on this new release and analyzing the 10-year history and complexity of TYPO3 v4, the TYPO3 community decided to branch out version 5 as a completely separate product, one that wouldn't replace version 4 in the near future and as such needed to have its own name. Published as FLOW3, now renamed Neos Flow, it along with various other packages then served as the basis for the start of development of project Phoenix.

In September 2012, the TYPO3 developers decided on the name for the new product, "TYPO3 Neos". With TYPO3 Neos 1.0 alpha1, a public test version was released in late 2012. In May 2015 the TYPO3 Association and the Neos team decided to go separate ways, with TYPO3 CMS remaining the only CMS product endorsed by the Association and the Neos team publishing Neos as a stand-alone CMS without any connection to the TYPO3 world.

In January 2017, Neos 3.0 has been published, along with a new version of Flow framework and a name change of its configuration language from TypoScript2 to Fusion.

== See also ==
- Content management
- Content management system
- List of content management systems
- TCPDF library for generating PDF documents with TYPO3
- Pages in category TYPO3
