= MAMP =

Web software type

MAMP is a solution stack composed of free and open-source and proprietary commercial software used together to develop and run dynamic websites on Apple Macintosh computers.

== Specifications and uses ==
Operating system	macOS
Web server	Apache, or nginx
Database management system	MySQL, or MariaDB
Web development	PHP, Perl, or Python

The name MAMP is an acronym that stems from the names of the components of the system: macOS (the operating system); Apache (the web server); MySQL or MariaDB (the database management system); and PHP, Perl, or Python (programming languages used for web development). The name is derived from LAMP, a similar stack of all open-source software widely used for websites, but substituting the proprietary macOS for the open-source Linux OS. (Similar "AMP" stacks exist for other operating systems.) MAMP is not limited to these choices of components, however; nginx can be used in place of Apache, for example, and the same goes for substituting MariaDB for MySQL.

Some of the software packages that comprise MAMP (particularly Apache and PHP) are pre-installed with macOS; compatible versions of the remainder are readily available for installation and use. MAMP is commonly used with and to develop for popular CMS programs such as WordPress and Drupal by setting up a local development environment on laptop or desktop computers, without the need for a standalone web server.
