= PEAR =

Repository of PHP software code

The PHP Extension and Application Repository, or PEAR, is a repository of PHP software code. Stig S. Bakken founded the PEAR project in 1999 to promote the re-use of code that performs common functions. The project seeks to provide a structured library of code, maintain a system for distributing code and for managing code packages, and promote a standard coding style. Though community-driven, the PEAR project has a PEAR Group which serves as the governing body and takes care of administrative tasks. Each PEAR code package comprises an independent project under the PEAR umbrella. It has its own development team, versioning-control and documentation.

== PEAR packages ==
A PEAR package is distributed as a gzipped tar file. Each archive consists of source code written in PHP, usually in an object-oriented style. Many PEAR packages can readily be used by developers as ordinary third party code via simple include statements in PHP. More elegantly, the PEAR package manager which comes with PHP by default may be used to install PEAR packages so that the extra functionality provided by the package appears as an integrated part of the PHP installation. Unlike the Comprehensive Perl Archive Network (CPAN) archives, which PEAR took as its model, PEAR packages do not have implicit dependencies so that a package's placement in the PEAR package tree does not relate to code dependencies. Rather, PEAR packages must explicitly declare all dependencies on other PEAR packages.

The PEAR base classes contain code for simulating object-oriented destructors and consistent error-handling. Packages exist for many basic PHP functions including authentication, caching, database access, encryption, configuration, HTML, web services and XML.

PEAR means “PHP Extension and Application Repository.” It is a framework and distribution system for reusable PHP components. It extends PHP and gives a higher level of programming for all web developers. PEAR is divided into three different classes that are: PEAR Core Components, PEAR Packages, and PECL Packages. The PEAR Packages include functionality giving for authentication, networking, and file system features and tools for working with HTML and XML templates.

== PEAR package manager ==
The PEAR package manager provides a standardized way to install, uninstall, or upgrade with new PEAR packages or PECL extensions. Before installing a package it can also be instructed to take care of package dependencies so all the extra needed packages are installed too.

The PEAR package manager is run from the command line using the pear command. Usually it is therefore only the server administrator who can alter the installed base of PEAR and PECL extensions. On PHP installations running on Linux, the PEAR package manager is ready for usage by default, but on Windows the PEAR package manager is only available after running a batch file called go-pear.bat.

== PEAR2 Pyrus ==
With Pyrus an attempt was undertaken to redesign and improve PEAR from the ground up for PHP 5.3 or newer. Pyrus can be used to install packages from PEAR channels. The last release is from March 2011 and its development might have been discontinued due to the popularity of Composer.

== PEAR and Composer ==
With Composer there is an alternative available for managing packages for a PHP project. Composer also supports the installation of PEAR packages. Some people of the PHP community argue for replacing PEAR in favor of composer.

== Pending Discontinuation ==
Deprecation of PEAR had been officially suggested by PHP maintainers in 2016 and 2025, but neither of those attempts made it to an official vote. In August 2026, maintainers proposed discontinuation again on the grounds that 534 out of 603 PEAR packages are officially marked "unmaintained", and 63 of the remaining 69 are practically unmaintained as well. Additionally, the PHP project is wary of continuing to point an official subdomain to infrastructure over which they have no control. The proposal suggested that a read-only archive of the existing PEAR site would be maintained until the end of 2027 to allow application developers time to migrate to Composer and supported packages. Voting closed on October 19th, with unanimous support for the proposal.

As a result of this vote, PHP 8.7 will remove PEAR from the official PHP source distribution, and official PHP websites will encourage the use of Composer instead. The PEAR website will be transitioned to read-only, and the pear command-line tool will keep working against it until the end of 2027. Mailing lists hosted by the PHP project will be deactivated, though read-only archives will remain available.

== PECL ==
The PHP Extension Community Library (PECL), (pronounced 'pickle') is conceptually very similar to PEAR, and indeed PECL modules are installed with the PEAR Package Manager. PECL contains C extensions for compiling into PHP. As C programs, PECL extensions run more efficiently than PEAR packages. PECL includes modules for XML-parsing, access to additional databases, mail-parsing, embedding Perl or Python in PHP scripts and for compiling PHP scripts. PECL spun off from the PEAR Project in October 2003. Originally it was called the PEAR Extension Code Library, but it now operates independently of PEAR.

PECL extensions are documented alongside standard extensions within the PHP Manual, so there is no special manual for PECL extensions. Also, several extensions began their development cycle in PECL and ended up in core (the distributed PHP source) and in many of these cases the PECL versions become unmaintained.

In August 2025, PHP maintainers suggested the deprecation of PECL, to be replaced by PHP Installer for Extensions (PIE). In September 2025, the decision was confirmed by unanimous vote (with 5 abstentions). As of October 2026, while PECL will continue to work for the foreseeable future, it is no longer recommended to be used.

== See also ==
- Composer (software)
