= Comparison of social networking software =

Social networking software provides the technological basis for community driven content sharing and social networking.

See also Comparison of software and protocols for distributed social networking, especially for open-source software. Comparison of microblogging and similar services may also be relevant.

== Social networking software comparison ==
Name	Last Access	License	Cost	Source code	Version	Installation	Codebase	SSO support	RSS	RSS Reader/ Aggregator	Access control	Wiki	Forum	Blog	Media sharing	Credits and payments	p2p Video-conferencing	Messaging	Event Calendar	Group Rides	Social Grouping	Tagging	Connectivity	Poll Generation/Tally	Contact Management	Supports the Semantic Web	Supports DataPortability	Customizable	Comment	Name
BuddyPress	2020-01-08	GPL 2.0	Free	Yes	5.1.2	Out of the box	PHP, MySQL/PostgreSQL	OpenID + OAuth + Facebook + Twitter built in	Yes	Yes	Users, groups (extensible via plugins)	No	Yes	Yes	Yes			Yes	Yes		Yes	Yes	Yes	Yes	Yes	?	?	Extensible via plugins with a flexible API; skinnable; available in many languages	Based on WordPress.	BuddyPress
Drupal	2008-11-02	GPL 2.0	Free	Yes	5	Out of the box	PHP, PDO	OpenID, module	Yes	Yes	Yes	No	Module	Yes	Yes			Yes	Module		Plugin	?	?	Yes	Yes	?	?	Extensible via plugins, widgets, tasks, events, REST; skinnable; available in many languages	Community and collaboration platform with many integrated core applications	Drupal
Elgg	2014-01-01	GPL 2.0	Free	Yes	3.3.11	Out of the box	PHP, MySQL / PostgreSQL / Oracle / Microsoft SQL Server	Module	Yes	Yes	Users levels, Groups, Pages	Yes	Yes	Yes	Yes			Yes	Yes		Yes	Yes	Facebook, Google, Content Mirroring, RSS importer, External Widgets	Yes	?	?	?	Extensible via plugins with a flexible API; skinnable; available in many languages	?	ELGG
Humhub	2021-01-28	AGPLv3 or under a proprietary license	Free or €99 / monthly	Yes	1.10.3	Ou of the box	PHP, MySQL, or MariaDB with InnoDB storage engine installed	Yes	No	No	Users, Spaces, Groups	Yes	Yes	Yes	Yes			Yes	Yes		Yes	Yes	Yes Discord, Google, Facebook, Kopano, OnlyOffice	Yes	Yes	?	?	Provides API	?	Humhub
ImpressCMS	2012-04-22	GPL 2.0	Free	Yes	1.5.20	Out of the box	PHP, MySQL	Facebook Connect	Plugin	Yes	Yes	No	Yes	Yes	via plugins			Yes	Plugin		Yes	?	?	?	?	?	Yes	?	Content management	ImpressCMS
Jamroom	2017-02-07	MPL	Free, $299 Premium, Hosted from $39	Yes	6.1.0	Hosted Out of the box	PHP, MySQL	OpenID + LDAP + Yubikey + Active Directory built in	Yes	Yes	Yes	Module	Yes	Plugin	Yes			Yes	Module		Module	Module	@all by Module	?	Yes	Yes	?	Module	Small Core, 150+ modules, responsive, SEO optimized, cloud scalable, friendly support and community	Jamroom
Joomla!	2007-03-05	GPL 2.0	Free	Yes	3.9.5	Out of the box/hosted	PHP, MySQL	LDAP + Active Directory built in	?	?	Users roles	Module	Yes	Yes	Images/Photos, Videos, Maps, etc.			Yes	Module		Module	Module	Module	No	Yes	?	?	Open source, Plugins, Themes, Events, Widgets	Customizable Facebook-style newsfeed	Joomla!
Kune	2012-04-22	AGPLv3	Free	Yes	9.7.2	Out of the box (deb package)	Java-based GWT, auto-generated AJAX	LDAP, Facebook Connect, Google Account, GitHub, Microsoft Account, others	?	?	?	?	?	?	?			?	?		?	?	?	?	?	?	?	?	Federated, focused on real-time group collaboration and social networking, Apache Wave-based	Kune
Minds	2018-02-20	AGPLv3	Free	Yes	1	Out of the box	Angular2, Cassandra, NodeJS, PHP, Elasticsearch, React Native	oAuth 2.0, Google Account, Facebook Connect, Custom	Yes	Yes	Group Levels, Memberships, Access Control, Privacy, Permissions	Yes	Yes	Yes	Images, Video, Docs, Music, Extensions			Messenger, WebRTC Chat, Mailbox, iOS and Android Chats, MAC and WIN Chat Apps	No		Groups, Events, Webinars	Categories, Tags, Inline Hashtags	Yes	Yes	Yes	Yes	Yes	Yes	Enterprise ready and scalable for millions of users	Minds
Movim	?	AGPLv3	Free	Yes	0.34.1	?	PHP	No	No	?	Group Levels, Memberships, Access Control, Privacy, Permissions	No	No	Yes	Yes			Yes, and audio + video calls based webRTC	No		Yes	Yes	Yes, with all networks supporting XMPP	?	?	?	Yes	?	Federated, based on XMPP	Movim
pH7CMS	2023-01-02	GPL 3.0	Free	Yes	17.9.0	Out of the box	PHP 5.6+, JS, MySQL, MariaDB	oAuth 2.0, Google Account, Facebook Connect, Custom	Yes	Yes	Access Control Levels, User levels, Actions, Memberships, Privacy, Permissions, Groups, Pages	No	Yes	Yes	Images, Video, Docs, Music, Extensions			Yes	Yes		Yes	Yes	No	Interactive Polls, Visual Graphs	Yes	Yes	Yes	Yes	99% OOP code, MVC pattern, module- and template-based approach	pH7CMS
Telligent Community	2009-06-23	Proprietary	Per License	Yes	1.3.2	Out of the box	PHP, MySQL	Facebook Connect	Yes	?	Users, Groups	No	Component	Component	?			Plugin	Plugin		Plugin	Yes	?	Yes	Module	?	?	Module, Plugins, ImpressCMS Persitable Framework (IPF)	?	Telligent Community
Tiki Wiki CMS Groupware	2015-01-06	LGPL 2.1	Free	Freely available via stable releases and development SVN	1.6.4	Out of the box	PHP, MySQL	OpenID + LDAP + Active Directory built in	Blog, Files, Groups, Users, Tags	Yes	User levels, Groups	Yes	Plugin	Yes	Image, video, audio, documents, any filetype, automatic podcast support (Kaltura Elgg Plugin)			Yes	Plugin		Yes	Yes	Webservices	Plugin	Yes	?	?	Yes, based on WordPress theme and plugin architecture	?	Tiki Wiki CMS Groupware
XOOPS	2010-06-06	GPL 2.0	Free	Yes	0.2.0 (beta/production)	Out of the box	PHP, MySQL	Facebook Connect	?	?	Users (with roles), Groups	?	?	?	?			?	?		?	?	?	?	?	?	?	Open source; extensible via gadgets (wave extensions) & via modules; skinnable; available in many languages	Modular approach	XOOPS
Name	Last Access	License	Cost	Source code	Version	Installation	Codebase	SSO support	RSS	RSS Reader/ Aggregator	Access control	Wiki	Forum	Blog	Media sharing			Messaging	Event Calendar		Social Grouping	Tagging	Connectivity	Poll Generation/Tally	Contact Management	Supports the Semantic Web	Supports DataPortability	Customizable	Comment	Name
