= Govdex =

Australian government initiative

govdex is an Australian government initiative designed to facilitate business process collaboration across policy portfolios, administrative jurisdictions and agencies. The service is designed to promote effective and efficient information sharing, providing governance, tools, methods and re-usable technical components across Australian government.

govdex is managed by the Australian Government Information Management Office (AGIMO), in the Department of Finance and Deregulation (Australia).

A major component of govdex is a wiki-based framework and other collaboration tools. These tools enable Australian Government entities to establish online communities of practice and manage collaborative initiatives across government and non-government stakeholders.

== govdex principles/tenets ==
The primary govdex principles/tenets are:

- govdex avoids duplicating technical interoperability work already done at state and federal levels. Instead govdex focuses on the semantic (information and process) interoperability layer.
- govdex includes governance and procedural components that define the organization structure, roles, processes and methods that support the framework.
- govdex provides a mechanism for the definition, and on-going development of the meta-data, common data dictionaries, and taxonomies that form the basis of a semantic framework.
- govdex provides a standards repository and a services registry as the central mechanism to support discovery and re-use.
- The govdex architecture recognizes that data and services remain the responsibility of the owning agency with govdex only providing a framework to facilitate the deployment of interoperable services.
- govdex is firmly founded on open international standards - facilitating re-use and permitting the use of low cost off-the-shelf tools that support the standards.
- govdex is independent of any specific vendor product or technology but should be easily deployed on specific products and technologies.
- govdex provides a high level of quality and trust for its methods, tools, and data.
- govdex is usable without the need for deeply skilled personnel. A well-developed methodology with supporting documentation and tools is the key to achieving this goal.
- govdex is firmly grounded in specific and practical interoperability projects that demonstrate cross-jurisdictional interoperability.

== Key components of the govdex service ==
The key components of govdex include:

- A Standards Development Framework
- A Services Deployment Framework, aligned to the Standards Development Framework
- A Governance Model & Operational functions and processes to ensure the Development and Deployment Frameworks are used appropriately.
- Tools, Methods & Content (including Standards) to aid the use of the Development and Deployment Frameworks.
- Technical Infrastructure to deliver the entire interoperability offering.

govdex does not include an integrated email solution, such as that found in Yahoo Groups. It does not provide an automatic update to members following a post to a specific group, or entry on a specific discussion board.

== See also ==
- GCTools
