= COMCAR =

Australian government agency

Department overview
- Formed: 1976
- Jurisdiction: Commonwealth of Australia
- Parent Department: Department of Finance
- Website: maps.finance.gov.au/comcar

COMCAR (Commonwealth car service) is a subdivision of the Australian Department of Finance. It was founded in 1976. It provides a fleet of vehicles for the prime minister (Prime Ministerial Limousine), governor-general, federal parliamentarians and senior federal judiciaries.

Prime minister Andrew Fisher purchased the first car for ministerial use in 1910. The Commonwealth car service adopted the formal name COMCAR in 1990.

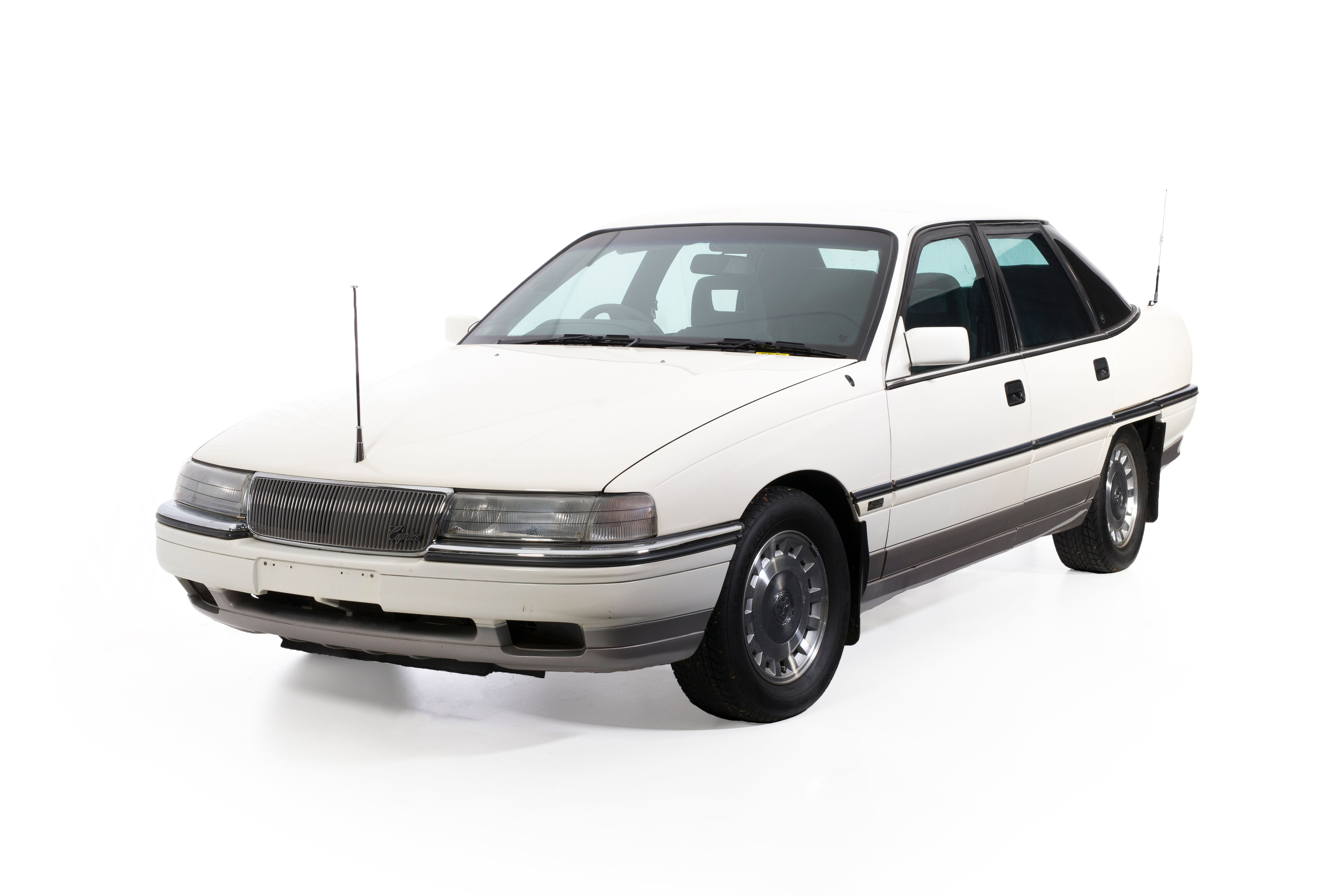
1991 Holden Caprice (VQ) armoured car used by COMCAR

The majority of the fleet consisted of the Holden Statesman and Ford LTD in 2010.

In 2012 an electric Holden Commodore was tested in a 2-week trial. In 2019 COMCAR announced that BMW 6 series GT and Hybrid Toyota Camry were chosen to replace the fleet of Holden Caprice.

Minister for Finance Mathias Cormann announced in 2020 that the fleet's colour was to change from white to grey. The colour of the fleet was previously white since 1972. The initial announcement caused controversy with Cormann stating "White reflects a bit of a colonial past we’ve moved on from. Grey is a better reflection of a forward-looking Australia.", he later stated that the comment was intended to be humorous and not the actual reason for the change.

The BMW iX was selected in 2023 as the standard fleet vehicle of COMCAR. The BMW iX XDrive40 being majority of the fleet and the BMW iX XDrive50 being used for long-range driving.
