= GCTools =

GCTools is a suite of enterprise digital collaboration applications maintained by the Canadian Government. It consists of:

- GCcollab, the Government of Canada's first public-facing platform to enable collaboration and networking with experts, partners and any Canadian by invitation (based on Elgg);
- GCconnex, an internal professional collaboration and networking platform open to Canadian public servants (the original Elgg fork);
- GCpedia, a wiki-based collaborative workspace and knowledge sharing platform (similar to Wikipedia) open to Canadian public servants (based on MediaWiki);
- GCintranet, a central repository of authoritative government information and communications to reach all public servants;
- GCmessage is a pilot internal messaging system (based on Rocket.Chat);
- GCdirectory, an employee directory service;
- GCprofile is a prototype directory for the public sector and also an authentication system.

The GCTools enable interdepartmental sharing of knowledge and information, and helping public servants build and grow communities to work together to meet the needs of Canadians in an open and transparent environment. With a focus on agile development and user-centric design, the GCTools provide channels to navigate ecosystems that connect more than 160,000 federal public servants (representing over 60% of the federal public service), and since 2016, with cross-jurisdictional partners, students, academics, experts and any Canadian citizen by invitation (GCcollab). They help to create relationships, spark experimentation and innovation, and support the sharing of best practices. They have been used to drive and sustain whole-of-government employee engagement activities (e.g., Beyond 2020), a reset of the Government of Canada's policy management framework, peer-to-peer IT support services and many other initiatives.

== GCcollab ==
GCcollab is a newer GCTools platform, designed as an external collaboration and professional networking platform hosted by the Government of Canada. It is accessible to Canadian federal, provincial and territorial public servants, as well as open to academics and students of all Canadian universities and colleges. Other external users can also be invited to use the platform through email invitations.

GCcollab is an open source (powered by Elgg), cloud-based collaboration and professional networking tool designed to better enable public servants in their daily work. For instance, users can create their own profiles, add their work experience information, their interests and skills, and use many features to collaborate and share their knowledge on a wide range of topics.

The tool is also equipped with its own wiki-based collaborative workspace and knowledge sharing platform similar to Wikipedia, GCwiki,

GCcollab is managed by the GCTools Team, which also manages the GCconnex and GCpedia platforms. The team works under the Office of the Chief Information Officer of Canada in the Treasury Board Secretariat of Canada.

=== Launch ===
GCcollab was established in September 2016 as a one-year pilot project with the objective of offering a variety of Web 2.0 and social media functions.

=== Features ===
GCcollab offers many features that emulate those of external social networking and collaboration sites, such as LinkedIn, Twitter, Facebook, Google Docs, Flickr and Reddit.

For instance:

- The wire: a feature similar to Twitter where users can post text with the 140 character limit. Other users are able to 'like' or 'reply' to the comment.
- Chat
- User profiles
- Blogs: users can write an article that reflects upon their ideas or opinions based on a subject relevant to their work practices.
- Groups and subgroup pages
- Files and folders

== GCconnex ==
GCconnex is a legacy GCTools platform, designed as the Government of Canada's internal collaboration and professional networking platform. GCconnex enables public servants to connect, collaborate and share information more efficiently.

Users can also use the tool to update their professional profiles with their work experience, interests and skills.

GCconnex is managed by the GCTools Team, which also manages GCpedia and GCcollab. The team works under the Office of the Chief Information Officer of Canada in the Treasury Board Secretariat of Canada.

=== Launch ===
GCconnex was established in January, 2009, with the objective of offering a variety of social media functions to federal employees within the Government of Canada.

=== Features ===
GCconnex offers many features that emulate those of external social networking and collaboration sites, such as LinkedIn, Twitter, Facebook, Google Drive, Flickr, Reddit, and Messenger.

For instance:

- The wire: a feature similar to Twitter where users can post text with the 140 character limit. Other users are able to 'like' or 'reply' to the comment.
- Chat
- User profiles
- Blogs: users can write an article that reflects upon their ideas or opinions based on a subject relevant to their work practices.
- Groups and subgroup pages
- Files and folders

== GCpedia ==
GCpedia is a legacy GCTools component, designed as an internal wiki used by the Government of Canada’s employees for collaboration and knowledge sharing. Over 90 thousand federal employees are registered users and the platform holds around 400 thousand articles.

GCpedia has been used as a platform to take, publish, and distribute meeting minutes, to create project status dashboards, to collaboratively author interdepartmental papers, to brainstorm, and to create wiki-based briefing books.

GCpedia is managed by the GCTools Team, which also manages GCconnex and GCcollab. The team works under the Office of the Chief Information Officer of Canada in the Treasury Board of Canada Secretariat.

=== Launch ===
GCpedia was formally launched as a government-wide pilot, at the annual Government Technology Exhibition and Conference (GTEC) in Ottawa, Canada on October 28, 2008.

=== Potential uses ===
This is a list of existing and possible uses on GCpedia:

- Collaborate openly (within the Government of Canada) on a specific policy, document or subject
- Create and share meeting agendas, minutes, documents, project status dashboards, or wiki-based briefing materials
- Author interdepartmental papers collaboratively
- Organize interdepartmental working groups and communities of practice
- Share information, research, etc. that may be of interest to others
- Organize via individual's User Page links to their work on GCpedia and elsewhere, contact information, interests and experience, etc.
- Discover existing work that provides a head start to current projects

== See also ==
- Govdex, an Australian government collaboration site
- Diplopedia, the internal collaboration site of the US Department of State
