= David Tune =

Australian public servant

David Tune AO PSM

Secretary of the Department of Finance and Deregulation
- In office 31 August 2009 – 18 September 2013

Secretary of the Department of Finance
- In office 18 September 2013 – 27 June 2014

Personal details
- Born: David John Tune; 1954 (age 71–72)
- Occupation: Public servant

David John Tune (born 1954) is a retired senior Australian public servant. Between 2009 and 2014 he was Secretary of the Australian Government Department of Finance. From 2015 to mid-2021, he was chair of the federal government's Aged Care Sector Committee, and has been commissioned by the government to lead several independent reviews into the sector. He has also led other reviews, including reviews into parliamentary entitlements, the functioning of the National Archives of Australia, and the NDIS Act. As of January 2025 he is chair of the Independent Health and Aged Care Pricing Authority and of the Stretton Institute at the University of Adelaide. He was appointed Officer of the Order of Australia in 2015.

== Early life and education ==
David John Tune was born in 1954.

== Career ==
Tune joined the Australian Public Service in 1976.

Between 1986 and 1988 he worked on a secondment in the British Cabinet Office.

In August 2009, Tune was appointed Secretary of the Department of Finance and Deregulation. While secretary of that department in 2013, Tune was forced to sign off controversial tax-funded advertising intended to deter asylum seekers from making the journey to Australia by boat, during the care-taker period before an election.

Tune announced his retirement from the public service in May 2014, with his last day as Finance Secretary announced for 27 June. Tune served 38 years in public service. On his announcement, Mathias Cormann, Minister for Finance in the Abbott government, thanked him for his service, saying that he had been "an outstanding public servant who has served governments of both political persuasions with great distinction". Penny Wong, leader of the Senate for the Labor Party, who had worked with him during her stint as finance minister, said "His sustained contribution to public policy making has been profound".

=== Post-retirement work ===
From early 2015 to July 2021, Tune was chair of the federal government's Aged Care Sector Committee, which provided advice to the government on aged care.

In August 2015, Tune was appointed to co-chair a review into parliamentary entitlements, following intense scrutiny on the spending habits of politicians, and the resignation of Bronwyn Bishop as Speaker over her use of entitlements. In the review, Tune and his colleague John Conde proposed a new "principles-based" system and recommended the language of "entitlements" be renamed "work expenses".

In 2017 Tune was appointed by the Minister for Aged Care as an independent reviewer under the Aged Care (Living Longer Living Better) Act 2013, to review changes to the aged care systems since the Productivity Commission's 2011 report, "Caring for older Australians" (known as the "Living Longer Living Better" (LLLB) reforms), and following further changes in aged care policy. Tune wrote the "Legislated review of aged care" report for the Department of Health, published in September 2017.

In 2019, the government commissioned Tune to carry out an independent review of the NDIS Act. The report, which contains 29 recommendations to improve the operations of the NDIS, was handed to the government in December 2019, and was published in January 2020.

In January 2020, the "Tune Review" was submitted to the Australian government. This was published as "Report of the Functional and Efficiency Review of the National Archives of Australia" by the Attorney-General's Department in March 2021. This review looked at the workings of the National Archives of Australia (NAA), which had been criticised for taking a long time to deliver information, which was largely due to waiting for advice from other agencies, in particular sensitive records and those related to national security, before it is able to decide whether to declassify records and release them. Another issue is the deterioration of many records in storage, leading to potential be breaches of Part 5 Section 24 of the Public Governance, Performance and Accountability Act 2013. Among other recommendations, the report suggested spending A$67.7 million on digitising material most at risk, over a seven-year period. The government responded to the review on 20 August 2021, agreeing to funding the digitisation of at-risk records and reforms to the Archives Act 1983 (in consultation with the NAA and relevant departments and agencies), but saying that it would not implement the proposed Government Information Management Model, in which all government records management would be centralised into the NAA, at that point in time.

In October 2022, Tune was appointed to lead the Independent Capability Review of the Aged Care Quality and Safety Commission. The review was commissioned in response to recommendations 10 and 104 of the Royal Commission into Aged Care Quality and Safety, which was delivered in February 2021. In July 2023, his "Report of the Independent Capability Review of the Aged Care Quality and Safety Commission" was published. In June 2024, all 32 recommendations of the report were accepted by the Albanese government.

== Other roles and activities ==
From 1 February 2022 and as of January 2025, Tune has been chair of the Pricing Authority, which is the board of the Independent Health and Aged Care Pricing Authority. This body "provides independent and transparent advice to the Australian Government in relation to funding for public hospitals and residential aged care services". His term ends on 31 January 2027.

Since its establishment in 2020 and as of January 2025 Tune is chair of the Stretton Institute at the University of Adelaide.

== Recognition and awards ==
In 2009 Tune was awarded the Public Service Medal for outstanding public service in the development of significant economic and social policy reforms in a way that models whole-of-government service.

In 2014, he was appointed as a national fellow of the Institute of Public Administration Australia, in recognition of his achievement in the public sector.

In 2015, Tune was appointed an Officer of the Order of Australia at the 2015 Australia Day Honours, "for distinguished service to public administration through leadership of finance, budget and social policy initiatives, as an adviser to government, and through disaster recovery coordination and liaison".

Government offices
Preceded by Ian Watt	Secretary of the Department of Finance and Deregulation; 2009–2013	Succeeded by Himself as Secretary of the Department of Finance
Preceded by Himself as Secretary of the Department of Finance and Deregulation	Secretary of the Department of Finance; 2013–2014	Succeeded by Jane Halton
