= Rosemary Huxtable =

Australian public servant

Rosemary Huxtable AO PSM

Secretary of the Department of Finance
- In office 22 December 2016 – 8 August 2022
- Preceded by: Jane Halton
- Succeeded by: Jenny Wilkinson

Personal details
- Children: 3 sons
- Occupation: Public servant

Rosemary Therese Huxtable AO PSM is a retired senior Australian public servant. She was the Secretary of the Department of Finance from December 2016 to August 2022.

From 2010 to 2013, Huxtable was a Deputy Secretary in the Department of Health and Ageing. She moved to the Department of Finance in 2013, also as a Deputy Secretary. In her finance department role, Huxtable played a key role developing several Australian federal budgets.

When former Finance Secretary Jane Halton stood down in 2016, Huxtable was promoted to act as head of the agency, having been recommended to the role by the Prime Minister. She was appointed permanently to the role after it being recommended by the Prime Minister in December 2016. She retired on 8 August 2022.

== Awards and honours ==
Huxtable was awarded a Public Service Medal in 2005. She was appointed as an Officer of the Order of Australia in the 2023 King's Birthday Honours for "distinguished service to public administration through leadership roles in the areas of health and finance, and to strategic policy reform".

Government offices
Preceded by Jane Halton	Secretary of the Department of Finance; 2016–2022	Succeeded by Jenny Wilkinson
