= Prime Ministerial Limousine =

Car used by the Australian Prime Minister

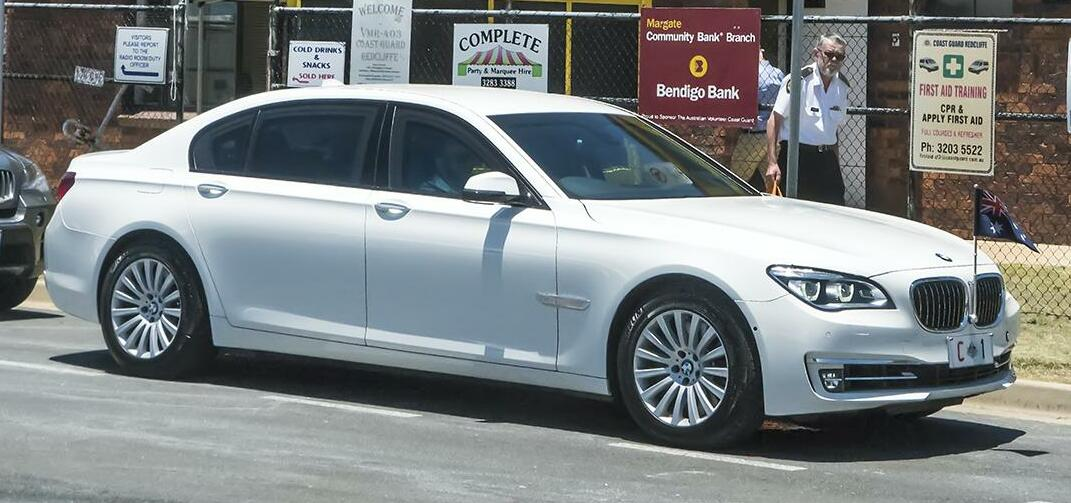
- The Prime Ministerial Limousine in 2017

Overview
- Type: BMW 7 Series
- Manufacturer: BMW
- Also called: C1 (Commonwealth One)

Body and chassis
- Class: Full-size luxury car (F)
- Body style: 4-door sedan

Chronology
- Predecessor: Holden Caprice

The Prime Ministerial Limousine is the official state car used by the prime minister of Australia. The current vehicle is a white BMW 7 Series. The prime ministerial and other ministerial limousines are maintained by COMCAR, a subdivision of the Department of Finance. The vehicle is often referred to in the media and the community as "C1", which is the number plate that the car displays (meaning "Commonwealth 1"). The Australian flag is centrally mounted on the bonnet of the vehicle.

Prime ministerial vehicles are transported and used wherever the prime minister travels. The vehicle is stored at Parliament House, the Lodge, Kirribilli House or an allocated COMCAR facility. While COMCAR administers the vehicles, they are driven by Australian Federal Police officers. Tony Abbott was the first prime minister to use the BMW 7 Series. The past model of prime ministerial limousine, the Holden Caprice, was first used by Bob Hawke, replacing the Ford LTDs that had been used in the 1980s.

== Current vehicle ==
The prime ministerial fleet was updated in 2014, replacing the Holden Caprice fleet with a suite of armoured BMW 7 Series High Security (F03) models. The AU$6.3 million fleet of BMW 7 Series were purchased initially by the Australian Government to protect visiting dignitaries for the 2014 G20 summit in Brisbane, and were later commissioned as the official prime ministerial fleet. The limousine, manufactured in Germany, has undergone extensive mechanical and protection-based modifications including armour and bulletproofing. The prime ministerial state car and a supporting armoured BMW X5 is administered by COMCAR, a division of the Australian Government's Department of Finance, and driven by trained officers of the Australian Federal Police.

=== Protection specifications ===
The vehicle has the same visual appearance as a regular BMW 7 Series. However, it has been subject to extensive modifications. The limousine has been fitted with bullet-proofed doors and windows, as well as armour on the floor of the vehicle. On top of this, the vehicle has a protected fuel tank that does not explode when damaged and can withstand a roadside bomb. A BAE and GM-Holden consortium also unsuccessfully bid for the contract.

== Previous prime ministerial limousines ==
- Holden Caprice
- Ford LTD (Australia)
- Mercedes-Benz 450SEL
- Bentley S3

== Gallery ==
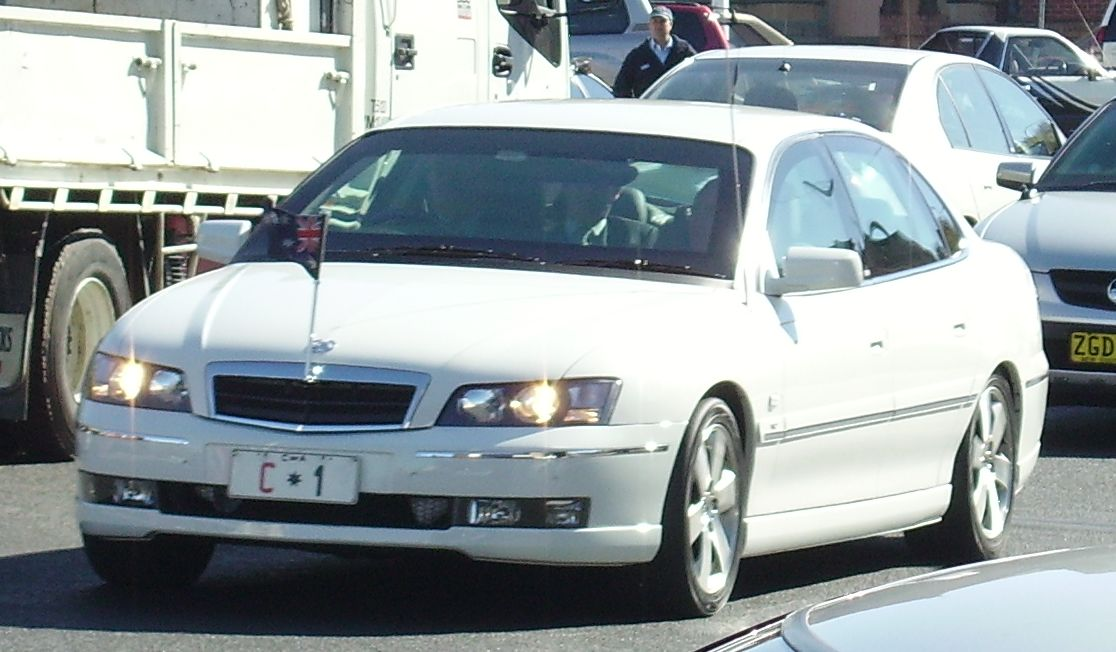
Holden Caprice of the prime minister, May 2007

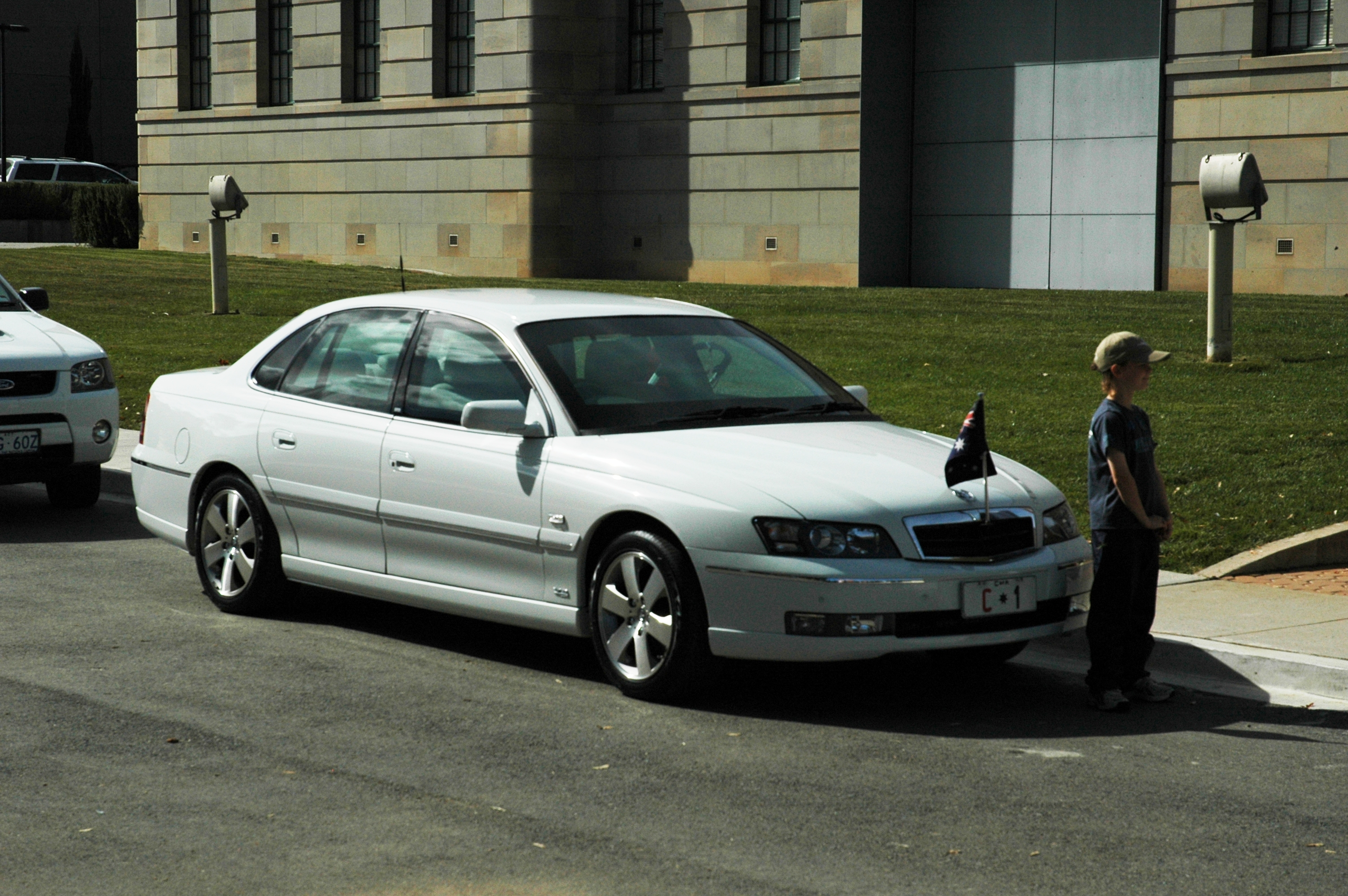
The prime ministerial Holden Caprice, April 2008

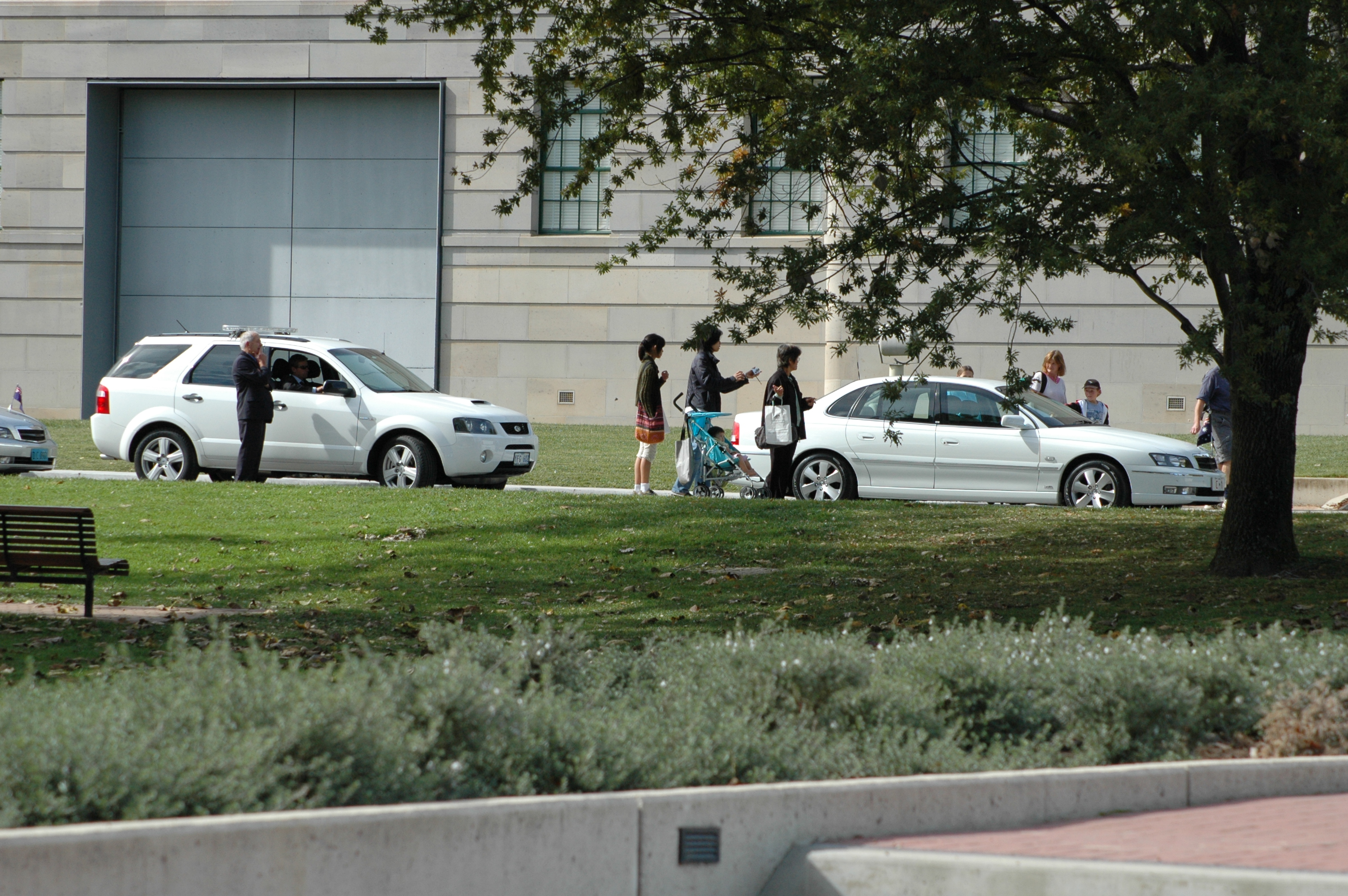
Australian Federal Police escort vehicle to the left of the Holden Caprice

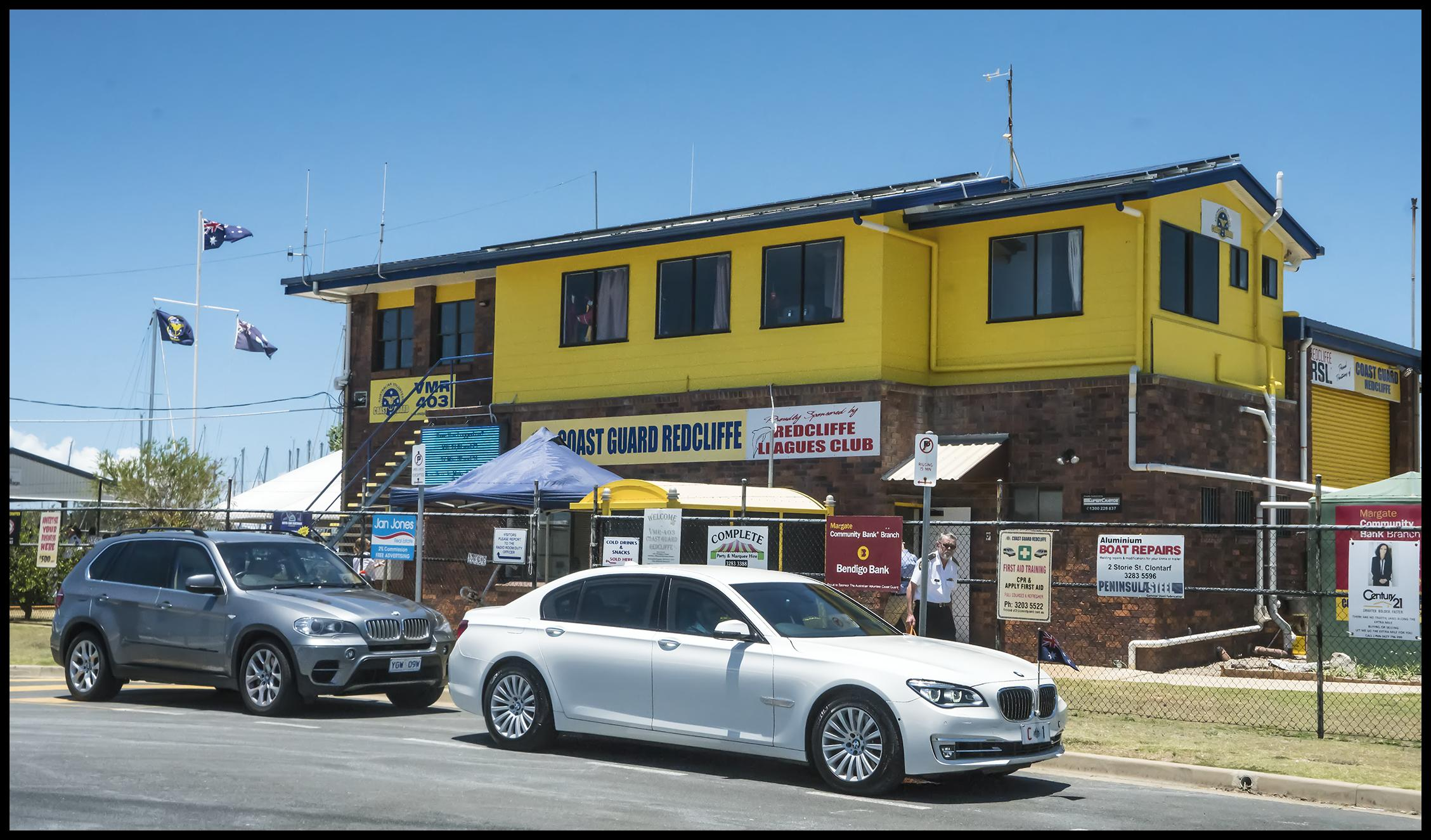
BMW 7 Series with a BMW escort vehicle, January 2017

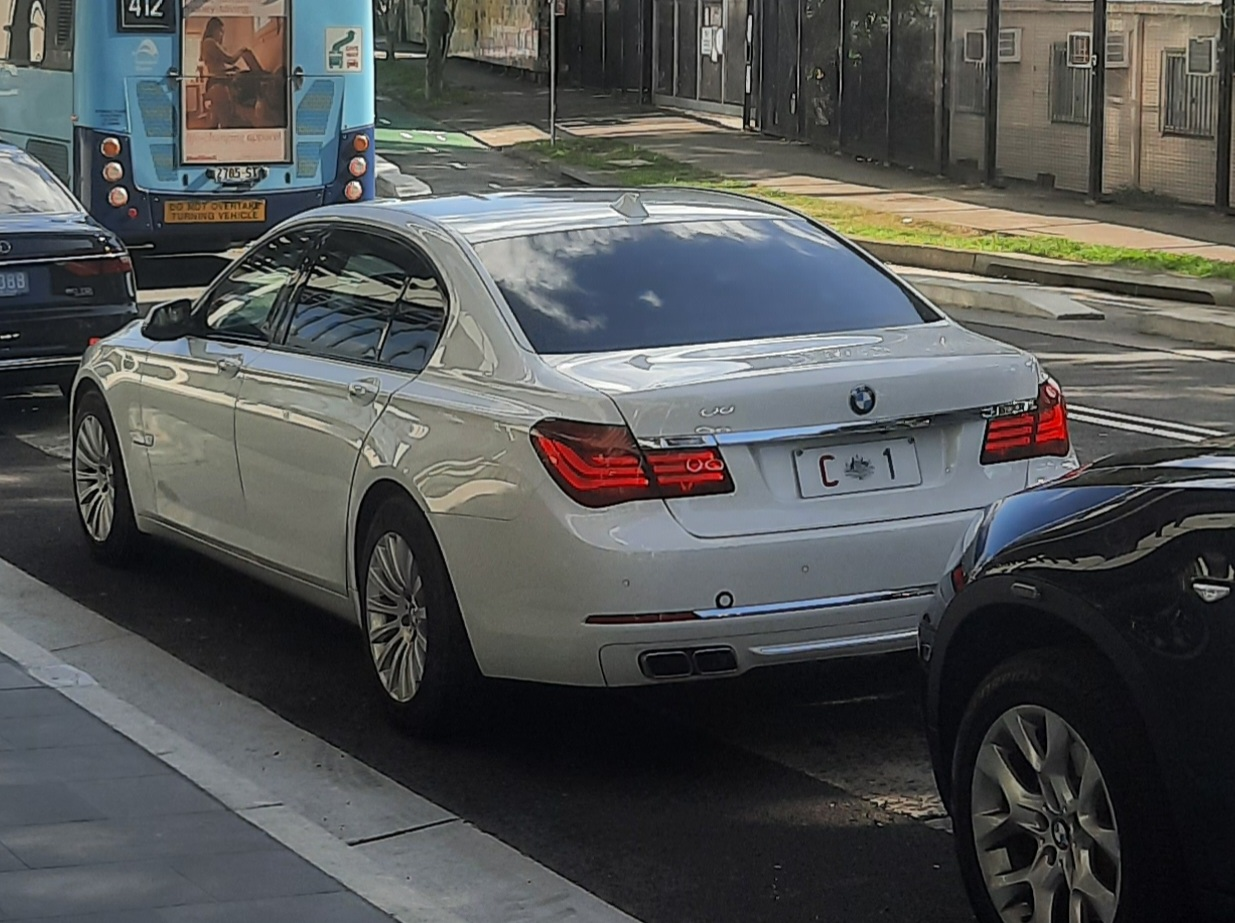
Rear view of the BMW 7 Series, August 2022

The vehicle's number plate (C1)

== See also ==
- Official state car
- Air transports of heads of state and government
  - Royal Australian Air Force VIP aircraft
- Ford Fairlane (Australia) - discontinued (announced May 2007)
- COMCAR
- Australian VIP transport
