= TCPDF =

PHP library to generate PDF files

- Original author: Nicola Asuni
- Initial release: January 6, 2005
- Stable release: 6.10.1 / 21 November 2025; 43 days ago
- Repository: github.com/tecnickcom/tcpdf
- Written in: PHP
- Operating system: Cross-platform
- Type: Software Library
- License: LGPLv3
- Website: tcpdf.org

TCPDF is a free and open source software PHP class for generating PDF documents. TCPDF is the only PHP-based library that includes complete support for UTF-8 Unicode and right-to-left languages, including the bidirectional algorithm.

In 2009, TCPDF was one of the most active of over 200,000 projects hosted on SourceForge (best ranked 6th on 3 April 2010).

TCPDF is also one of the most used PHP libraries in the world, due to it being already included in the most popular PHP-based CMS and applications, including: Joomla! 1.5, Drupal, Moodle, phpMyAdmin, Xoops, ImpressCMS, Jelix, SugarCRM, Symfony, TYPO3, Vtiger CRM, Yii Framework, CMS Made Simple, DaDaBIK, and many others.

Html2Pdf PHP script by Laurent Minguet is based on TCPDF v5.0.002. This library allows generating PDF documents specified via a subset of html without learning underlying TCPDF api.

The TCPDF class was originally derived in 2002 from the public domain FPDF class written by Olivier Plathey but now has been almost entirely rewritten and hundreds of new features added.

== Features ==
- no external libraries are required for the basic functions;
- all standard page formats, custom page formats, custom margins and units of measure;
- UTF-8 Unicode and right-to-left languages;
- TrueTypeUnicode, OpenTypeUnicode, TrueType, OpenType, Type 1 and CID-0 fonts;
- font subsetting;
- methods to publish some XHTML + CSS code, JavaScript and Forms;
- images, graphic (geometric figures) and transformation methods;
- supports JPEG, PNG and SVG images natively, all images supported by GD Graphics Library and all images supported via ImageMagick.
- 1D and 2D barcodes: CODE 39, ANSI MH10.8M-1983, USD-3, 3 of 9, CODE 93, USS-93, Standard 2 of 5, Interleaved 2 of 5, CODE 128 A/B/C, 2 and 5 Digits UPC-Based Extension, EAN 8, EAN 13, UPC-A, UPC-E, MSI, POSTNET, PLANET, RMS4CC (Royal Mail 4-state Customer Code), CBC (Customer Bar Code), KIX (Klant index - Customer index), Intelligent Mail Barcode, Onecode, USPS-B-3200, CODABAR, CODE 11, PHARMACODE, PHARMACODE TWO-TRACKS, Data Matrix, QR code, PDF417;
- ICC profiles, Grayscale, RGB, CMYK, Spot Colors and Transparencies;
- automatic page header and footer management;
- document encryption up to 256 bit and digital signature certification;
- transactions to UNDO commands;
- PDF annotations, including hyperlinks, text and file attachments;
- text rendering modes (fill, stroke and clipping);
- multiple columns mode;
- no-write page regions;
- bookmarks and table of content;
- text hyphenation;
- text stretching and spacing (tracking/kerning);
- automatic page break, line break and text alignments including justification;
- automatic page numbering and page groups;
- move and delete pages;
- page compression (requires php-zlib extension);
- XOBject templates;
- PDF/A-1b (ISO 19005-1:2005) support.
