= Jane Halton =

Australian public servant

Jane Halton AO PSM
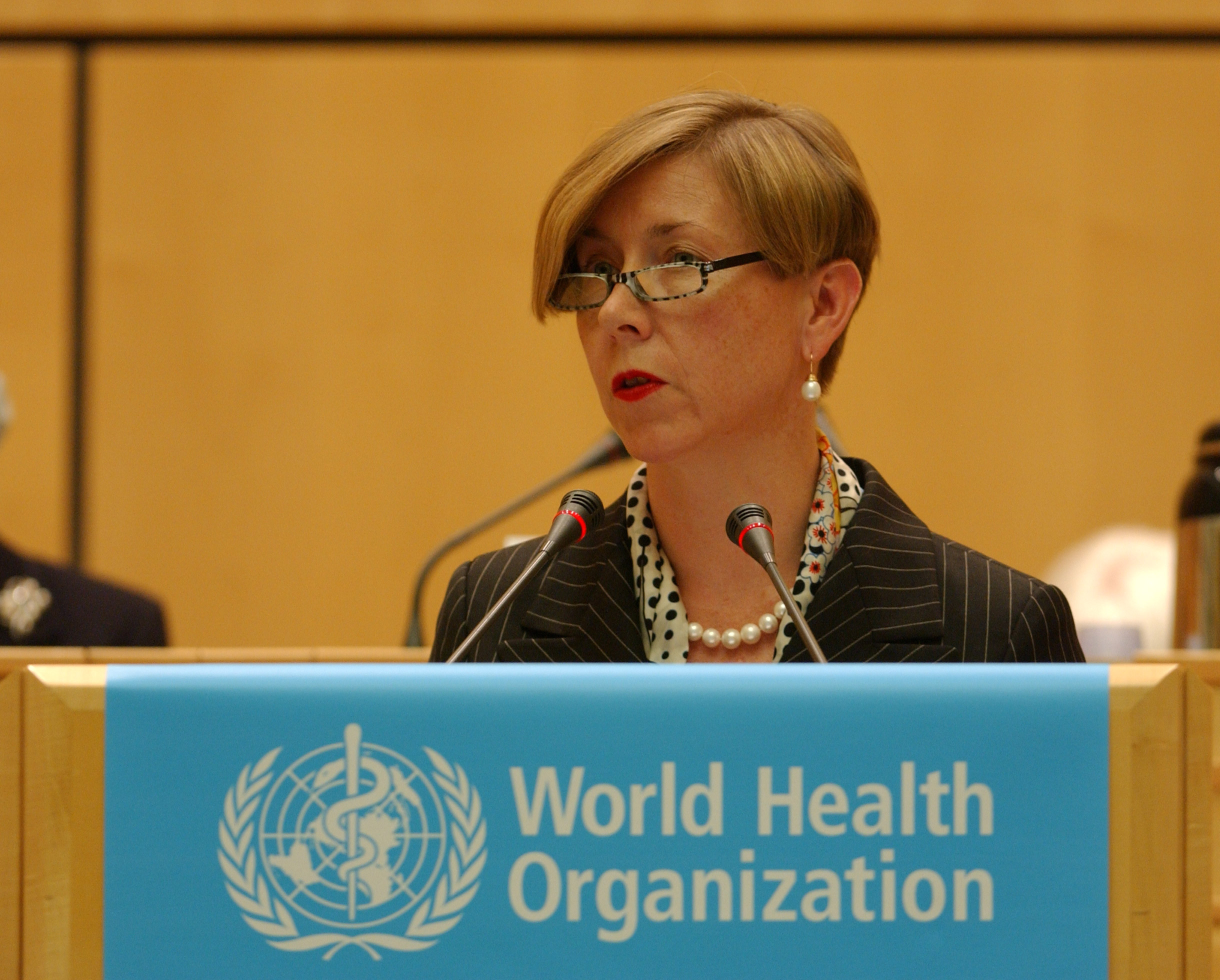
- Jane Halton addresses World Health Organization as president of the 60th World Health Assembly in 2007

Secretary of the Department of Finance
- In office 27 June 2014 – 15 October 2016

Secretary of the Department of Health
- In office 18 September 2013 – 27 June 2014

Secretary of the Department of Health and Ageing
- In office January 2002 – 18 September 2013

Personal details
- Born: Sarah Jane Halton; 4 January 1960 (age 66) Wickwar, Gloucestershire, England
- Spouse: Trevor Sutton
- Children: 2 sons
- Education: Australian National University
- Occupation: Public servant

Sarah Jane Halton AO PSM (born 4 January 1960) is a former senior Australian public servant, current global health leader and former casino board member. She was the head of the Department of Health between January 2002 and June 2014, and the head of the Department of Finance from 2014 to 2016. She has held senior board roles with ANZ Bank, Clayton Utz, the Institute for Health Metrics and Evaluation, the Coalition for Epidemic Preparedness Innovations (CEPI) and Crown Casino. She was the Independent Chair of COTA Australia (Council on the Ageing) beginning December 2017. In 2020, she was appointed to the Morrison government's National COVID Commission.

Halton has held concurrent roles within the gambling and casino industry at the same time she has held senior roles within global health organizations - including the Institute for Health Metrics and Evaluation (IHME). She held these conflicting roles despite IHME estimates that the "gambling-related burden of harm was 2.5 times more than diabetes and 3.0 times more than drug use disorder". Halton has not explained the rationale for holding these competing concurrent roles despite the remuneration from Crown averaging just under AUD 300,000 per year.

== Background and early life ==
Halton was born on 4 January 1960 in Wickwar, Gloucestershire, England. She and her family moved to Australia in 1973 when her father, Charles Halton, was recruited from Canada by the Whitlam government to lead the Department of Transport. She has an Honours degree in psychology from the Australian National University.

== Career ==
Halton first joined the Australian Public Service in the Australian Bureau of Statistics.

As a Deputy Secretary in the Department of the Prime Minister and Cabinet, Halton was convener of the People Smuggling Taskforce in the Children Overboard Affair.

Prime Minister John Howard appointed Halton as Secretary of the new Department of Health and Ageing in January 2002. The Department was reformed as the Department of Health in September 2013, when the Abbott government was elected, and Halton remained at the head. During this time, she was responsible for providing advice to government on issues including the administration of Medicare, the Pharmaceutical Benefits Scheme and private health insurance, and for implementing a $60 billion budget. While she was Health Secretary, Halton led the development of the first Memorandum of Understanding between Medicines Australia and the Australian Government, in 2010.

In June 2014, Halton was appointed Secretary of the Department of Finance. She identified strengthening the performance framework for measuring the impact of Australian Government programs and services as a priority in the role, with a focus on streamlining and providing a greater level of accountability. She also emphasized the scope of work harnessing technology to deliver public services more efficiently across government agencies into different platforms. Halton announced her resignation, effective 15 October 2016, on 16 September 2016.

After stepping down as Secretary, she was appointed to the boards of Crown Casino, the ANZ Bank and Vault Systems. While serving on the board of Crown Casino, and for a period as acting chairman, Halton oversaw Crown Resorts’ response to the Finkelstein Royal Commission investigations around its suitability to hold a casino license - stemming from failures to mitigate money laundering, strong ties to organized criminal networks, and other serious problems with Crown's corporate governance. Halton held concurrent roles within the gambling and casino industry at the same time she held senior roles in global health organizations. She held these conflicting roles despite the IHME estimates that "gambling-related burden of harm was 2.5 times more than diabetes and 3.0 times more than drug use disorder".

Halton is chair of the global Coalition for Epidemic Preparedness Innovations and in March 2020 was appointed to the executive board of the Australian National COVID-19 Coordination Commission.

== Awards and honours ==
Halton was awarded the Public Service Medal in 2002 and the Centenary Medal in 2003.

In 2014, she was ranked number eight in The Australian Women's Weekly Power List of Australia's 50 most powerful women.

Halton was created an Officer of the Order of Australia in June 2015. She was made an Honorary Fellow of the Australian Academy of Health and Medical Sciences (FAHMS) in 2015.

== References and further reading ==
- Malone, Paul (2006), "Chapter 19: Taking the 'Hospital Pass' – Jane Halton, Department of Health and Ageing", Australian department heads under Howard : career paths and practice (PDF), Canberra: The Australian National University, pp. 129–136, ISBN 1-920942-83-1, archived from the original (PDF) on 6 November 2013

Government offices
Preceded by David Tune	Secretary of the Department of Finance; 2014–2016	Succeeded by Rosemary Huxtable
Preceded by Herself as Secretary of the Department of Health and Ageing	Secretary of the Department of Health; 2013–2014	Succeeded by Martin Bowles
Preceded by Andrew Podger as Secretary of the Department of Health and Aged Care	Secretary of the Department of Health and Ageing; 2002–2013	Succeeded by Herself as Secretary of the Department of Health
