= Elgg (software) =

Open source social networking software

- Developers: The Elgg Foundation and the open source community
- Stable release: 7.1.2 / 21 October 2026; 15 days ago
- Written in: PHP
- Operating system: Cross-platform
- Type: Social networking
- License: GNU GPLv2 and X11 (MIT)
- Website: elgg.org
- Repository: github.com/Elgg/Elgg

Elgg is open source social networking software that provides individuals and organizations with the components needed to create an online social environment. It offers blogging, microblogging, file sharing, networking, groups and a number of other features. It was also the first platform to bring ideas from commercial social networking platforms to educational software.

== History ==
Elgg was the first platform to bring ideas found in commercial social networking platforms to education. It was founded in 2004 by Ben Werdmuller and Dave Tosh, based on informal papers they had written over the previous year. Combining their experience (Werdmuller was a web entrepreneur who had been building and facilitating online communities since 1995, while Tosh was a postgraduate student in online education) they created a social networking approach to e-learning, with the former designing the architecture and writing most of the code. Subsequently, they founded the company Curverider Ltd to continue the development of the software and to provide Elgg-related services. Elgg has since become a cross-purpose open source social networking platform.

In April 2009, Werdmuller decided to leave the project, leaving Brett Profitt in charge of development. Werdmuller has since released Known, an open source publishing platform. In May 2010 a hosted version of Elgg launched in beta. In December 2010, Curverider was acquired by Thematic Networks and Elgg was transferred to a non-profit foundation.

Elgg is free to download and use. It is dual licensed under the terms of the GNU General Public License (GPL) as published by the Free Software Foundation and the MIT License. Elgg runs on the LAMP (Linux, Apache, MySQL, and PHP) platform. Elgg is used by Lorea as the engine of N-1.cc, the self-organized social network of the Spanish 15-M social movement. The same applies for the self-organized Anillo Sur and Saravea Lorea latinamerican social networks.

In April 2010, a multiple site version of Elgg was released by the former core developer Marcus Povey. As of January 2013 this project can be found on GitHub, a new version based on Elgg 2.x was released in 2018.

== Sites powered by Elgg ==
Here is a list of some sites powered by Elgg

- Oxfam
- Royal College of British Architects
- Australian Government
- British Government
- Dutch Government (PLEIO)
- Government of Canada
- MITRE
- New Zealand Ministry of Education
- State of Ohio, USA
- The World Bank
- UNESCO
- United Nations Development Programme
- Canadian Employment and Immigration Union
- Tides Canada
- Aerospace
- The Executive Lounge
- Hill and Knowlton
- Institute of Executive Coaching
- Interactive Games & Entertainment Association
- internetini
- Live Out There
- UnltdWorld
- Wiley Publishing
- Harvard University Extension School
- Galaxy2 (.onion site, requires Tor to access)
- Athabasca University
- Saugus School District
- Stanford University
- Think Global School
- University of Brighton
- University of Calgary, Grid Research Centre
- Universite Lille 1
- University of Nebraska-Lincoln
- Johns Hopkins University
- Oregon State University
- Great Ormond Street Hospital
- University of Florida
- 7ias
- Holland Sociaal
- SEO-Vietnam
- Uganda Water & Sanitation NGO Network (UWASNET)
- Executive Networks
- Loyola High School
- Simplur, Inc.
- The Nurses Lounge
- ONCORE ePD
- University of Patras Alumni
- Athabasca University Landing

== See also ==
- Comparison of social networking software
- Social software
