= ImpressCMS =

Open source content management system

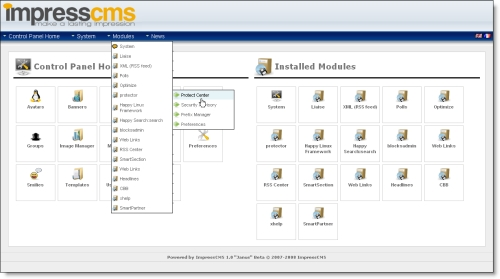
- ImpressCMS Control Panel
- Developer: The ImpressCMS Project
- Initial release: January 2008
- Stable release: 2.0.1 / 2025-01-06[±]
- Written in: PHP
- Operating system: Cross-platform
- Available in: Multilingual
- Type: Content Management System
- License: GNU General Public License version 2
- Website: ImpressCMS.org
- Repository: github.com/ImpressCMS/impresscms

ImpressCMS is an open source content management system for building and maintaining dynamic web sites, written in the PHP programming language and using a MySQL database. The product is released under the GNU General Public License version 2.

== History ==
The ImpressCMS Project was formed in late 2007 as a result of a division in the XOOPS community. The first beta release of ImpressCMS was introduced in January 2008 and ImpressCMS 1.0 Final was published in March 2008, establishing its new identity apart from XOOPS and incorporating bug fixes, security enhancements and new features. This was followed by the release of ImpressCMS 1.1 in October 2008.

Version 1.2 was released almost one year later. Major changes were done to the core of the system, hence the longer development time. This version introduced the ImpressCMS Persistable Framework (IPF) in the core, the ‘Content’ core module was transformed into a stand-alone module, and the installation system had a substantial refresh. On the visual side a new theme was introduced, featuring an AJAX redirect for system messages.

Marking the end of a long development period, version 1.3 was released on 20 September 2011. The ImpressCMS 1.3 series is a total refactor of the core system aimed at modernising the code structure, making the system smaller, faster and use less memory. This is also the last branch of ImpressCMS to provide compatibility with previous Xoops-based modules.

=== ImpressCMS 2.0 ===
ImpressCMS 2.0 marked the first major update after the long-running 1.x series, focusing on modernizing the codebase and improving performance, security, and multilingual support. The 2.0 branch reached stable status with the release of version 2.0.1 on 6 January 2025, followed by maintenance releases such as 2.0.2 and 2.0.3. Ongoing development and release information for the 2.0 series are maintained on the project's GitHub repository.

== Awards ==
In 2009, ImpressCMS placed first as the Most Promising Open Source CMS in the Packt Publishing awards.

ImpressCMS was the third-place winner of the Packt 2008 Most Promising Open Source CMS award, and a finalist in the 2008 SourceForge Best New Project award category. Marc-Andre Lanciault, a founder and lead developer for ImpressCMS, also received recognition on the list of Open Source CMS Most Valued People during the 2008 Packt awards.

== Features ==
ImpressCMS uses an open architecture, allowing webmasters to add modules into the core CMS for additional functionality. Modules exist that have been developed by an international community of developers, designers and fans and are able to handle most every task associated with the managing of web content and an online community.

The basic features of ImpressCMS are:

- Database driven
- Granular permissions for users and groups
- Complete user profiles and private messaging
- Customizable themes and templates
- Integrated comment system, with moderation options
- Integrated management for banner advertising
- Site-wide search function
- Multibyte language support
- PDF generation via TCPDF library

== See also ==
- Content management system
- Free software
- Open source software
- List of content management systems
