= Jamroom =

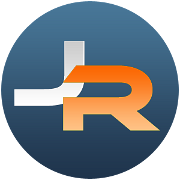
- Original authors: Talldude Networks, LLC
- Developer: The Jamroom Network
- Release: July 2003
- Stable release: 7.0.3 / 2026-03-15[±]
- Written in: PHP
- Operating system: Linux
- Type: Content management framework, Content management system, Social software
- License: Mozilla Public License
- Website: www.jamroom.net

Jamroom is a community focused open source software web content management system (CMS) and Framework based on PHP, and MySQL, MariaDB or Percona Server which runs on a web hosting service. Features include a module based extension system and skins using the Smarty templating engine. Jamroom is distributed under the open source Mozilla Public License (MPL)

== Features ==
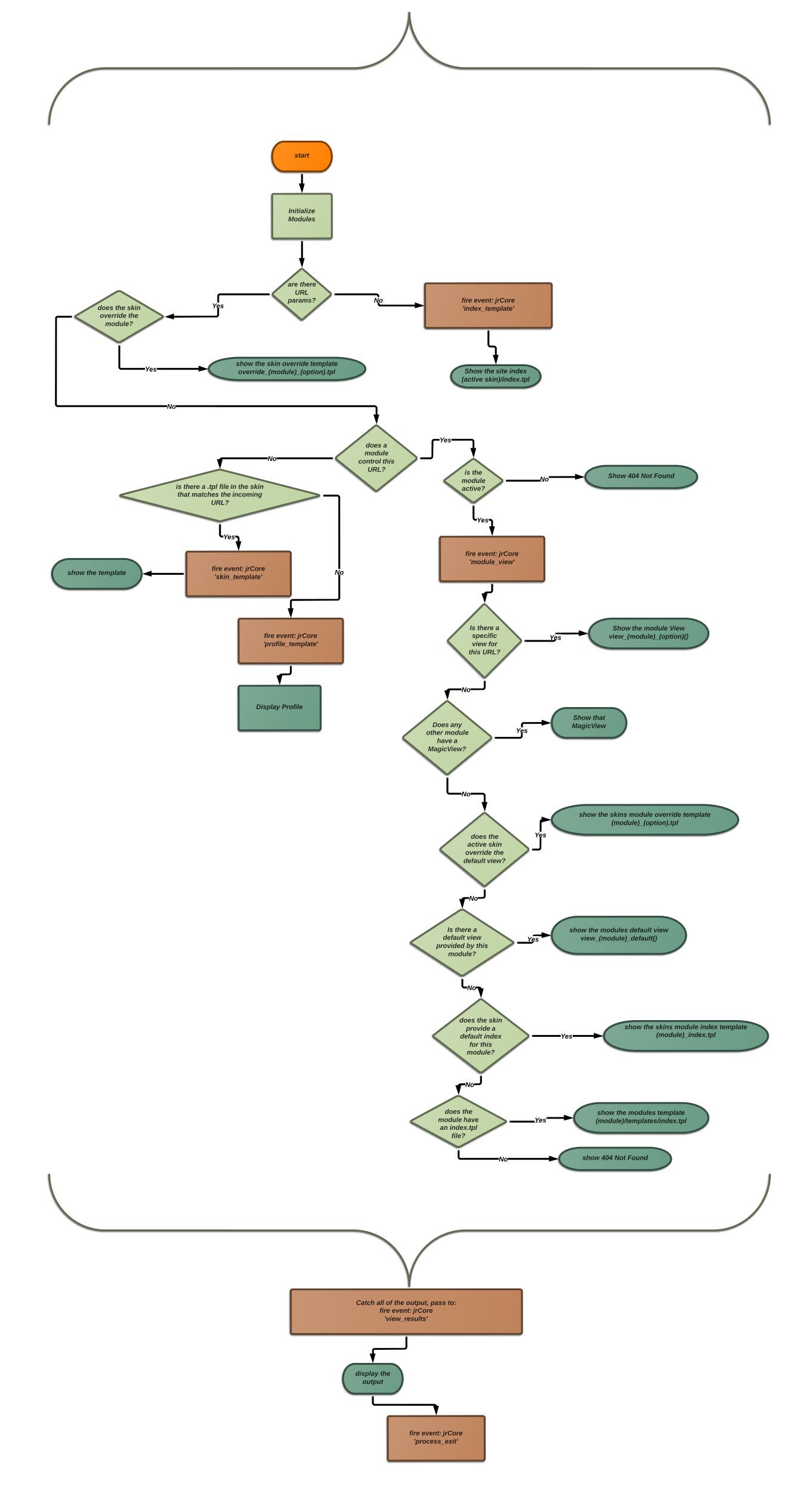
Jamroom URL routing

Jamroom has a web template system using a template processor.

=== Skins ===
Jamroom users may install and switch between skins. Skins allow users to change the look and functionality of a Jamroom website. Skins may be installed using the Jamroom "Marketplace" administration tool or skin folders may be uploaded via FTP. The PHP, HTML & CSS code found in themes can be added or edited for providing advanced features. Many Jamroom skins exist, some free, and some premium (paid for) templates.

=== Modules ===
One very popular feature of Jamroom is its module architecture which allows users and developers to extend its abilities beyond the core installation. From Jamroom 5 the structure of the system changed majorly from the previous version. The largest change being that even the core of Jamroom itself became a module. By adding additional modules, more features can be made available to users on their profiles.

=== RESTful API ===
Jamroom can be used to support creating web services according to the Representational State Transfer (REST) architectural pattern via an installable package called 'proxima'.

=== Profile Centric ===
A primary part of the design structure of Jamroom is the concept that profiles are the prime locations for content uploaded and imported into the site by the users. This derives from Jamroom's origins as a musician content management system for building communities where bands could showcase their talent. As of Jamroom 5, the focus of 'just for music' has been removed, but the profile centric nature has remained.

=== Mobiles ===
Up until Jamroom 4 the primary means of delivering video and audio content to visitors to the site was via flash. From Jamroom 5 the issue of some mobile devices not supporting flash made it important to change delivery methods in Jamroom too. Currently audio and video media that is uploaded to a Jamroom 5 installation is converted into various formats so that media can have the widest possible set of delivery scenarios.

== Core ==
In the Jamroom community, the term "core" has 2 uses. The first is the initial set of modules and skins that are downloaded and used to install a Jamroom community site. The second refers to the jrCore module itself. Everything in Jamroom is either a Module or a Skin.

=== Core Modules ===
Jamroom core download package includes the following modules that can be enabled by the administrator to extend the functionality of the core website.

- Timeline
- Blogs
- System Core
- Followers
- Image Support
- Email Support
- Marketplace
- Page Creator
- User Profiles
- Site Search
- Support Center
- User Accounts

=== Core Skins ===
Jamroom core download package includes the following skins.

- Elastic
- Lucid
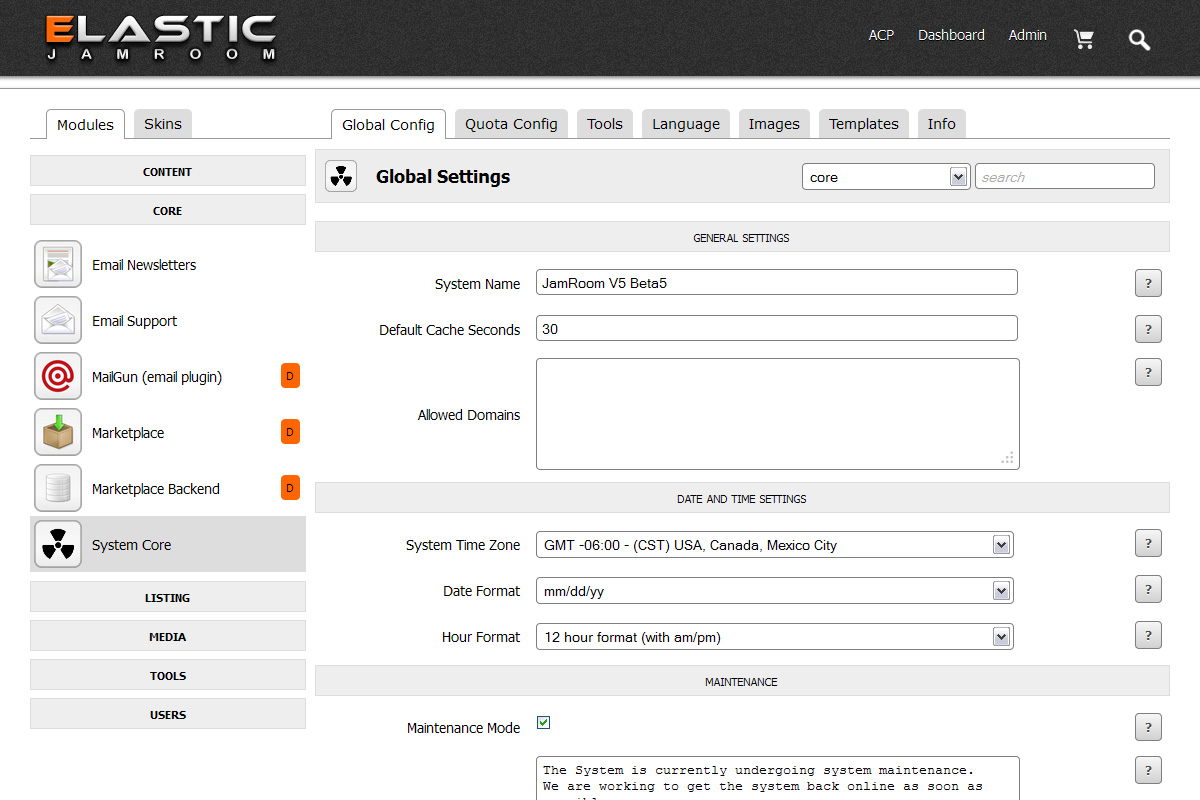
jrElastic: Screenshot3

== History ==
=== Releases ===
Unsupported
Supported
Latest version
Future version

Version	Release date	Notes
1	28 July 2003	
2	20 December 2003	Added a settings config system, an online store, statistics, bbcode, radio stations and more
3	9 August 2006	First release to support upgrading
4	16 January 2009	New module system API, new skins, image filters, SEO URL's Media approval system.
5	29 July 2013	Completely new core, easier development, modular design, open source.
6	27 September 2016	High Performance core updates, new email system, significant social updates and new chat module.
6.1	30 August 2017	Caching system improvements, database improvements, SSL improvements.
6.5	11 April 2020	Dashboard and Activity Log updates, support for SVG icons, overhauled of skin Style section.

== See also ==
- Comparison of web frameworks
- Comparison of social networking software
- List of content management systems
