= Financial Management and Accountability Act 1997 =

Act of the Parliament of Australia

The Financial Management and Accountability Act 1997 is an Australian Government act about the proper management of public money and property. It is administered by the Department of Finance and Deregulation.
