= COTA Australia =

Registered Australian charity

- Founded: 1979
- Purpose: Ageing, Ending poverty
- Location: Canberra, Melbourne
- Region served: Australia
- Leader: Patricia Sparrow
- Key people: Christopher Pyne, Chair; Patricia Sparrow, Chief Executive
- Employees: 5
- Website: www.cota.org.au

COTA Australia (formerly Council on the Ageing) is a registered Australian charity representing people aged over 50 in Australia. It forms an overarching umbrella organization for various other member organizations in all eight Australian territories.

== Functions ==
COTA works for the interests of its members in areas of government, business, the media, and the wider society. It is present at national level as well as at regional state level. Current policy areas include but are not limited to:

- Aged Care
- Health
- Ageism
- Housing
- Employment
- Retirement incomes
- Non Metropolitan
- Essential services

== Leadership ==
- Jane Halton, a career public servant, was appointed chair of COTA in December 2017.
- In February 2024 Christopher Pyne, a former minister in the federal Liberal Party government, was appointed her replacement.

== See also ==
- Philanthropy
- Corporate social responsibility
- Social responsibility
