= Department of Health and Ageing =

Australian government department, 2001–2013

Department overview
- Formed: 26 November 2001
- Preceding Department: Department of Health and Aged Care (I)
- Dissolved: 18 September 2013
- Superseding Department: Department of Health (II)
- Jurisdiction: Commonwealth of Australia
- Headquarters: Phillip, Australian Capital Territory
- Employees: 5,251 (at April 2013)
- Annual budget: Over $36 billion (in 2004–2005)
- Department executive: Jane Halton, Secretary (2002–2013)
- Website: health.gov.au

The Department of Health and Ageing was a department of the Australian Government that existed between November 2001 and September 2013.

The department was created after the 2001 federal election from the Department of Health and Aged Care.

== Scope ==
Information about the department's functions and government funding allocation could be found in the Administrative Arrangements Orders, the annual Portfolio Budget Statements, in the department's annual reports and on the department's website.

According to the Administrative Arrangements Order made on 26 November 2001, the department dealt with:

- Services for the aged, including carers
- Public health and medical research
- Health promotion and disease prevention
- Primary health care of Aboriginal and Torres Strait Islander people
- Pharmaceutical benefits
- Health benefits schemes
- Specific health services, including human quarantine
- National drug abuse strategy
- Regulation of quality of therapeutic goods
- Notification and assessment of industrial chemicals
- Gene technology regulation

== Structure ==
The department was an Australian Public Service department, staffed by officials who were responsible to the Minister and assisting parliamentary secretary.

The secretary of the department was Jane Halton, appointed in January 2002.
