= Australian Government Information Management Office =

Government agency 2004–2014

Agency overview
- Formed: 8 April 2004
- Preceding agency: National Office for the Information Economy (NOIE)
- Jurisdiction: Commonwealth of Australia
- Agency executives: Glenn Archer, Australian Government Chief Information Officer (AGCIO); John Sheridan, Australian Government Chief Technology Officer (AGCTO)
- Website: www.agimo.gov.au

The Australian Government Information Management Office (AGIMO) was a branch of the Australian Government. It was established on 8 April 2004, taking over some of the functions of the former National Office for the Information Economy (NOIE).

Functions of the former NOIE relating to the promotion and coordination of the use of new information and communications technology to deliver Government policies, information, programs and services were placed with AGIMO. On 22 October 2004, the then Prime Minister, John Howard, announced that the Australian Government Information Management Office would be incorporated in the then Department of Finance and Administration. After the 2007 federal election, the name of the department was changed to the Department of Finance and Deregulation.

On 22 October 2004, functions of the former NOIE relating to broader policy, research and programs were transferred to the Office for the Information Economy in the then Department of Communications, Information Technology and the Arts. Following the change of government at the 2007 general election, that agency was renamed the Department of Broadband, Communications and the Digital Economy.

AGIMO fostered the efficient and effective use of information and communication technologies (ICT) by Australian Government departments and agencies. It provided strategic advice, activities and representation relating to the application of ICT to government administration, information and services. AGIMO administered the Australian Government's principal online gateway, australia.gov.au as well as the pan-government online collaboration service Govdex.

On 11 April 2008, the Minister for Finance and Deregulation, Lindsay Tanner, announced that Sir Peter Gershon had accepted his invitation to lead an independent review of the Australian Government's management of information and communication technology (ICT).

The review was to identify ways in which the Australian Government can strengthen the whole-of-government management of ICT and maximise the benefits from ICT to drive greater efficiency and better services. The review was also to examine the way in which Australian Government agencies manage ICT investments, including maintenance, inter-agency links, development and staffing. Sir Peter Gershon was supported by the Department of Finance and Deregulation and submitted his report to the Minister on 28 August 2008, with recommendations on improving the efficiency and effectiveness of ICT within Government. The review was part of the broader ongoing reform agenda to improve the efficiency of government spending and deliver better value for money, which was a component of the election platform of the Australian Labor Party, which won the 2007 general election.

The recommendations of the Gershon Review were accepted in full by the government of the time and were implemented, although the long-term impact has been described as having "fallen short or been wound back".

On 17 December 2012 A New Direction for AGIMO was blogged, announcing the creation of a new Australian Government Chief Technology Officer role to complement the role of the Australian Government Chief Information Officer (CIO). Mr John Sheridan was appointed to the CTO position and Mr Glenn Archer was appointed to the CIO role. These changes took place on 4 February 2013.

AGIMO was effectively split into two functions, the CIO and a new CTO role. In brief, the CIO looked after whole of government ICT policy while the CTO looked after whole of government ICT services and procurement. The CIO continued to lead AGIMO, while the CTO was in charge of the newly created Technology and Procurement Division. In January 2014, Archer resigned as CIO and in a further restructure in May 2014 the CIO role was removed, and functions moved to the Department of Finance.

== See also ==
- australia.gov.au
- GovDex
- e-Government
