= Department of Finance (Australia) =

Department of the government of Australia

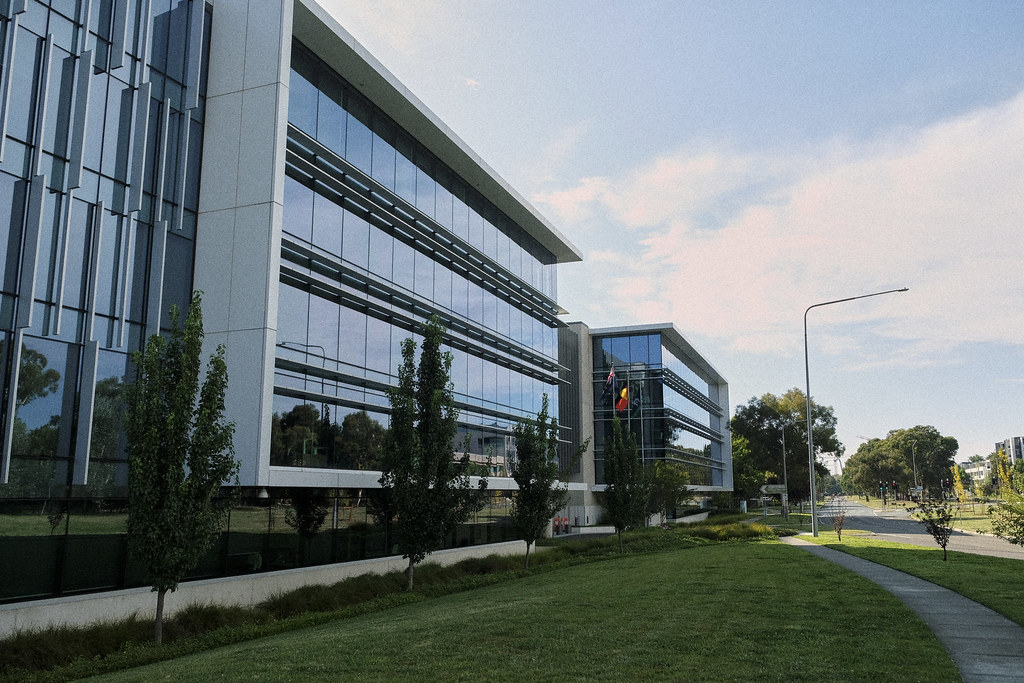
- Department of Finance head office in Forrest, Australian Capital Territory

Department overview
- Formed: 18 September 2013
- Preceding Department: Department of Finance and Deregulation
- Jurisdiction: Commonwealth of Australia
- Headquarters: 1 Canberra Avenue, Forrest, Australian Capital Territory
- Employees: 1,263 (2021)
- Annual budget: A$57.521 billion
- Minister responsible: Katy Gallagher, Minister for Finance
- Department executives: Matt Yannopoulos, Secretary (2025–present); Jenny Wilkinson, Secretary (2022–2025); Rosemary Huxtable, Secretary (2016–2022); Jane Halton, Secretary (2014–2016)
- Child agencies: Australian Electoral Commission; Australian Government Information Management Office; Australian Government Future Fund; Comcover
- Website: www.finance.gov.au

The Department of Finance is a department of the Australian Government that is responsible for assisting the government across a wide range of policy areas to ensure its outcomes are met, particularly with regard to expenditure, fiscal management and operations of government.

The administrative head of the department is the Secretary of the Department of Finance, presently Matt Yannopoulos, who reports to the Federal Minister for Finance, presently Senator Katy Gallagher.

Unlike in many countries, Australia's Department of Finance has a broad range of responsibilities across many economic areas, not limited to advising on Government programs and policy. These include directly administering programs and responsibilities, and having several corporate areas and sub-agencies administered within them.

The head office of the department is located at One Canberra Avenue, in the Canberra suburb of Forrest. Formerly, it was located in the John Gorton Building, named after Australia's prime minister between 1968 and 1971.

== History ==
The Department of Finance was formed by way of an Administrative Arrangements Order issued on 18 September 2013 and replaced the functions previously performed by the former Department of Finance and Deregulation. In an earlier reconstruction, the department was called the Department of Finance and Administration.

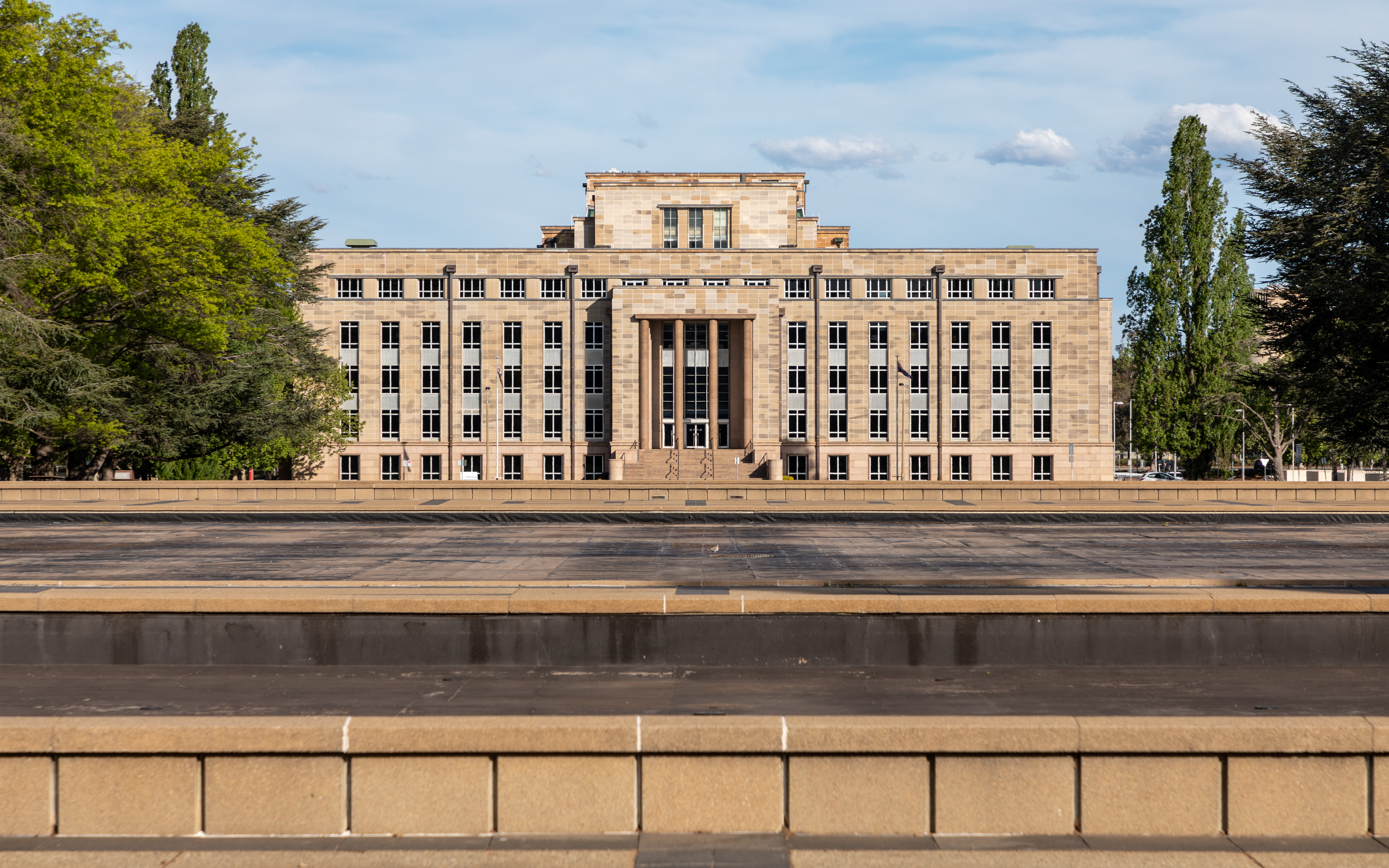
The previous Department of Finance head office, the John Gorton Building

=== Preceding departments ===
- Department of Finance (7 December 1976 – 9 October 1997)
- Department of Administrative Services (30 January 1994 – 9 October 1997)
- Department of Finance and Administration (9 October 1997 – 3 December 2007)
- Department of Finance and Deregulation (3 December 2007 – 18 September 2013)

== Operational activities ==
In an Administrative Arrangements Order made on 13 May 2025, the functions of the department were broadly classified into the following matters:

- Budget policy advice and process, and review of governmental programmes
- Government financial accountability, efficiency, governance and financial management frameworks, including grants and procurement policy and services (excluding information and communications technology procurement policy and services)
- Shareholder advice on Government Business Enterprises (GBEs) and commercial entities treated as GBEs
- General policy guidelines for Commonwealth statutory authorities
- Superannuation arrangements for Australian Government civilian employees and members of parliament and retirement benefits for Federal Judges and Governors-General
- Asset sales
- Commonwealth property policy framework, legislation and policy for the management of property leased or owned by the Commonwealth, including acquisition, disposal and management of property interests
- Management of non-Defence Commonwealth property in Australia, including construction, major refurbishment, sustainability, acquisition, ownership and disposal of real property
- Electoral matters
- Administration of Parliamentarians' work expenses
- Administration of the Australian Government's self-managed general insurance fund (Comcover)
- Policy advice on the Future Fund, Nation-building Funds and the DisabilityCare Australia Fund; and authorisation of payments from the Nation-building Funds and the DisabilityCare Australia Fund recommended by relevant Agencies
- Co-ordination of Government Advertising
- Public data policy and related matters
- Whole of government information and communications technology
- Information and communications technology procurement policy and services
- Whole of government regulatory policy, practice and performance
- Whole of government data and digital policy coordination

== See also ==
- Australian federal budget
- Financial Management and Accountability Act
- List of Australian Commonwealth Government entities
- Minister for Finance
