= HumHub =

- Developers: HumHub GmbH & Co. KG
- Stable release: 1.18.3 / 18 May 2026; 50 days ago
- Written in: PHP, JavaScript, CSS/Less
- Operating system: Cross-platform
- Type: Social networking service
- License: GNU Affero General Public License, version 3 (Community Edition), HumHub Commercial Licence (Commercial License)
- Website: humhub.org
- Repository: github.com/humhub/humhub

HumHub is a free and open-source social network software written on top of the Yii PHP framework that provides an easy-to-use toolkit for creating and launching your own social network.

== Design ==
The platform can be used for internal communication and collaboration that can range from a few users up to huge Intranets that serve companies with hundreds or thousands of employees. The platform was created to be self-hosted and currently comes with pretty normal requirements, working with most shared hosting environments around. HumHub also supports themes and modules to extend the functionality for almost all requirements.

== History ==
HumHub was originally developed by zeros+ones, a web agency from Munich and was spun off as an independent company in early 2015.
