= Known (software) =

Open-source publishing software

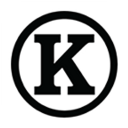
- Original authors: Ben Werdmuller, Erin Richey
- Stable release: 1.5 / 2 June 2023; 2 years ago
- Written in: PHP
- Platform: web
- Type: Blog software, Content Management System,
- License: Apache License 2.0
- Website: withknown.com
- Repository: github.com/idno/Known

Known is an open source publishing tool designed to provide a way of more easily publishing status updates, blog posts, and photos to a wide range of social media services. It also allows you to keep a copy of the content you publish and post on your own site.

Known is available as installable open source software, similar to WordPress. It is a part of the IndieWeb movement, and is used as a teaching tool in higher education. It also supports multi-user use, and is sometimes considered as an intranet platform.

Known supports the W3C Recommendations Micropub and Webmention among others.

Known is supported since 2019 by Open Collective that serves as fiscal sponsor since for many FLOSS projects.
