= Department of Finance and Deregulation =

Australian government department, 2007–2013

Department overview
- Formed: 3 December 2007
- Preceding Department: Department of Finance and Administration
- Dissolved: 18 September 2013
- Superseding Department: Department of Finance (II)
- Jurisdiction: Commonwealth of Australia
- Headquarters: Canberra
- Employees: 1,946 (at April 2013)
- Annual budget: A$522m (2012)
- Ministers responsible: Lindsay Tanner, Minister (2007–2010); Penny Wong, Minister (2010–2013)
- Department executives: Ian Watt, Secretary (2007–2009); David Tune, Secretary (2009–2013)

The Australian Department of Finance and Deregulation was a federal government department that existed between December 2007 and September 2013. Its role was to help the Australian Government achieve its policy objectives by contributing to four key outcomes:

1. Sustainable Government finances
2. More efficient Government operations
3. Efficiently functioning Parliament
4. Effective and efficient use of information and communication technology by the Australian Government

== Purpose ==
The purpose of the Department of Finance and Deregulation was stated as:

We provide high quality, strategic policy and financial advice to support government decision-making and improved Australian Government financial management.We deliver professional support services to our Ministers, Parliamentarians and their staff, and the Government as a whole.

== Operations ==
The matters dealt with by the Department included:

- Budget policy advice and process
- Government financial accountability
- Shareholder advice on Government Business Enterprises
- Superannuation of former and current members of parliament and Australian Government employees
- Government asset sales
- Management of non-Defence Government-owned property
- Electoral matters (through the Australian Electoral Commission)
- Administration of Parliamentarians' entitlements
- Administration of the Australian Government's self-managed general insurance fund
- Government online delivery and information technology and communications management (through the Australian Government Information Management Office)
- Advice on the Australian Government Future Fund
- Management of government records (through the National Archives of Australia)
- Central advertising system
