= XOOPS =

Content management system software

Xoops

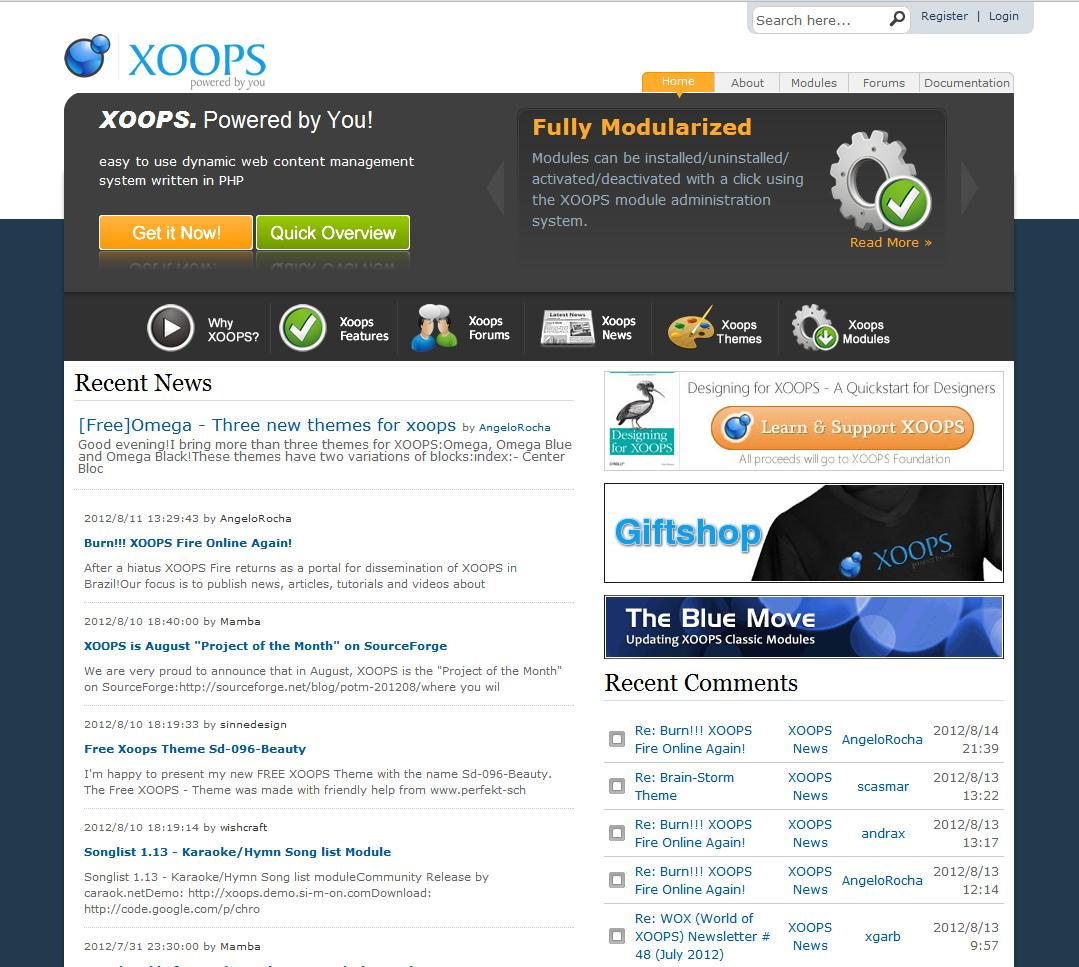
- Developer: The XOOPS Project
- Stable release: 2.5.11 / 2023-12-24[±]
- Preview release: 2.6.0 alpha 3 (September 18, 2013; 12 years ago) [±]
- Written in: PHP
- Type: content management system
- License: GPL-2.0-or-later
- Website: xoops.org
- Repository: github.com/XOOPS/XoopsCore

XOOPS /ˈzuːps/ is a free open-source content management system (CMS), written in PHP. It uses a modular architecture allowing users to customize, update and theme their websites. XOOPS is released under the terms of the GNU General Public License (GPL) and is free to use, modify and redistribute.

== Overview ==
XOOPS is an acronym of "eXtensible Object Oriented Portal System". Though started as a portal system, it later developed into a web application framework. It aims to serve as a web framework for use by small, medium and large sites, through the installation of modules. For example, a small XOOPS installation can be used as a personal weblog or journal, but this can be expanded upon and customized, i.e. users might add the appropriate modules (freeware and commercial) to store content in news, forums, downloads, and others.

== Key features ==
Community
Because XOOPS is released under the terms of the GNU General Public License (GPL) the growth and development of XOOPS is dependent on the contributions of a worldwide community effort.

Database
XOOPS uses a relational database (currently MySQL) to store data required for running a web-based content management system.

Advanced access control layer
Administrators have the ability to grant specific groups of users specific access rights to content and features such as edit, delete, upload, add attachments, publish content, and so on.

Modularized
Modules can be installed, uninstalled, activated, and deactivated using the module administration system.

Core features usable by modules
XOOPS possess a number of core features that can be used by modules like permissions, comments, notifications and blocks features.

Personalization
Administrators have the ability to set specific permissions for user access and control of individual elements of their websites.

User Management
The ability to search for users by various criteria, send email and private messages to users through a template-based messaging system.

International language support
The XOOPS community has official support sites for non-English-speaking users. Additionally XOOPS itself supports multi-byte character sets for languages that use characters not in the Latin alphabet, for example Japanese, Simplified and Traditional Chinese, Korean, etc. The multi-language support is also available on the PDF generation feature provided by the TCPDF library.

Theme-based skinnable interface
XOOPS uses themes for page presentation. Both administrators and users can change the look of the entire web site by selecting from available themes.

Templates
XOOPS uses the Smarty templating engine which allows many benefits such as easier separation between business logic and presentation logic as well as content caching.

Built-in LDAP authentication

Some SEO add-ons
A number of XOOPS modules contain features to facilitate the indexing of a website in search engines, like metatags, title tags and occasionally some URL rewriting. However, XOOPS does not give its users full control over their URLs. Where URL rewriting is possible, XOOPS often uses redirects that may confuse search engines. In addition, some XOOPS modules create duplicate content by making the same information available on more than one URL while in other cases (especially in case of multilingual sites), several sets of content may be made available through the same URL.

== See also ==
- Content management system
- Free software
- Open source software
