= List of open-source code libraries =

List of open-source code libraries
Library name	Programming language	Open-source license
Accord.NET libraries	C#	LGPLv3, GPLv3
Apache Lucene	C#	Apache 2.0
ASP.NET Core	C#	MIT
Dapper ORM	C#	Apache 2.0
Framework Class Library	C#	MIT
Infer.NET	C#	MIT
Math.NET Numerics	C#	MIT
ML.NET	C#	MIT
NHibernate	C#	LGPL-2.1
SignalR	C#	MIT
Standard Libraries (CLI)	C#	MIT
Apache Portable Runtime	C	Apache 2.0
Automatically Tuned Linear Algebra Software	C, Fortran	BSD License
Binary File Descriptor library	C	LGPL-2.1-or-later
C POSIX library	C	LGPL, MIT, BSD
C standard library (libc)	C	ISO/IEC 9899
Cairo	C	GPLv2
Chipmunk	C	MIT
Core Foundation	C	Apple Public Source License
DirectFB	C	LGPL-2.1
Expat	C	MIT
Fast Artificial Neural Network	C	GPL
FFmpeg	C	LGPL/GPL
FreeTDS	C	MIT
FreeType	C	FTL
Fontconfig	C	MIT
GD Graphics Library	C	MIT
GDK	C	LGPL-2.1
GEGL	C	GPL-3.0
GIO	C	LGPL-2.1
GLib	C	LGPLv2.1
GNet	C	LGPL-2.1
glibc	C	LGPL-2.1-or-later
GNU Libtool	C	GPL-3.0
GNU Multiple Precision Arithmetic Library	C	GPL-3.0
GNU portability library	C	GPL-3.0
GNU Portable Threads	C	LGPL-2.0
GNU Readline	C	GPL-3.0-or-later
GNU Scientific Library	C	GPL
GnuTLS	C	LGPL-2.1-or-later
GObject	C	LGPL
GTK library	C	LGPL-2.1+
GTK Scene Graph Kit	C	LGPL-2.1
IUP	C	MIT
Libart	C	LGPL-2.0-or-later
libavcodec	C	LGPL-2.1
libcurl	C	curl License/MIT
libdca	C	GPL-2.0
libevent	C	MIT
libffi	C	MIT
libfixmath	C	MIT
libjpeg	C	Custom BSD-like
Libpcap	C	BSD-3-Clause
libpng	C	libpng License
LibRaw	C	GPL-2.0
LibreDWG	C	GPL-3.0
LibreSSL	C	ISC
Librsvg	C	LGPL-2.1
libsndfile	C	LGPL-2.1
LibTIFF	C	LibTIFF License
libusb	C	LGPL-2.1
libuv	C	MIT
LibVNCServer	C	GPL-2.0
libvpx	C	BSD-2-Clause
libxml2	C	MIT
libxslt	C	MIT
Little CMS	C	MIT
LZFSE	C	Apache 2.0
Mbed TLS	C	Apache 2.0
Mesa	C	MIT
MsQuic	C	MIT
MuJoCo	C	Apache 2.0
MuPDF	C	AGPL-3.0
Mustache	C	MIT
ncurses	C	MIT
Netpbm	C	MIT
Nettle	C	GPL-2.0-or-later
Newt	C	MIT
nghttp2	C	MIT
Oniguruma	C	BSD
OpenGL Utility Library	C	SGI Free Software License B
OpenJPEG	C	GPL-2.0
Oracle Berkeley DB	C	Dual-licensed GNU AGPL
Pango	C	LGPL
Perl Compatible Regular Expressions	C	BSD
PROJ	C	MIT
libpthread	C	GPL-2.0-or-later
raylib	C	zlib
Seed	C	MIT
Simple DirectMedia Layer	C	Zlib License
SVGALib	C	LGPL-2.1
Systemd libraries	C	LGPL-2.1-or-later
Tk	C	BSD-style
UMFPACK	C	LGPL-2.1
Vorbis	C	BSD
VDPAU libvdpau	C	MIT
XCB	C	MIT
Xft	C	MIT/X
Xlib	C	MIT
XMLStarlet	C	MIT
zlib	C	Zlib
Zopfli	C	Apache 2.0
Allegro	C, C++	zlib
ARToolKit	C, C++	GPL
DevIL	C, C++	LGPL-2.1
FFTW	C, OCaml	GPL-2.0-or-later
GraphicsMagick	C, C++	ImageMagick License
ImageMagick library	C, C++, Perl, Python, Ruby, Java, PHP	ImageMagick License
International Components for Unicode	C, C++, Java	ICU-4.0
libcamera	C, C++	GPL-2.0
Math Kernel Library	C, C++, DPC++, Fortran	Apache 2.0
libSass	C, C++	MIT
libSBML	C, C++	LGPL-2.1
LibX	C, C++, Python	MIT
Microsoft PowerToys	C, C++	MIT
MoltenVK	C, C++	MIT
Netlib	C, C++, Fortran, MATLAB	Public Domain
SQLite	C, C++, Swift, Python, Java	Public domain
OpenSSL	C, C++	Apache 2.0
PLplot	C, C++, Fortran, Java, OCaml, Python, Tcl	LGPL
VDPAU	C, C++	MIT
Windows Template Library	C, C++	CPL, MPL
Armadillo	C++	MPL 2.0
Asio	C++	Boost Software License
Bitpit	C++	LGPL-3.0
Boost	C++	Boost Software License
Botan	C++	MPL-2.0
C++ Standard Library	C++	GPL-3.0-or-later
Caffe	C++	BSD
CAPD	C++	GPL-3.0
CGAL	C++	GPL-3.0
Cinder	C++	MIT
ClanLib library	C++	zlib
Class Library for Numbers	C++	GPL
CppUnit	C++	GPL-3.0
Crypto++	C++	Boost Software License
deal.II	C++	GPL-3.0
Dlib	C++	Boost Software License
Eigen	C++	MPL2
fastText	C++	MIT
FLTK	C++	LGPL-2.0-or-later
Geospatial Data Abstraction Library	C++	MIT
General Polygon Clipper	C++	zlib
GLFW	C++	Zlib License
Google Test	C++	BSD-3
HarfBuzz	C++	MIT
Insight Segmentation and Registration Toolkit	C++	Apache 2.0
Jackets library	C++, MATLAB	Apache 2.0
JSBSim	C++	GPL-3.0
JUCE	C++	GPL-3.0
KDE Frameworks	C++	LGPL-2.1+
LEMON	C++	LGPL-3.0
LevelDB	C++	BSD
Libdash	C++	MIT
libLAS	C++	LGPL-2.1
libsigc++	C++	LGPL
LIVE555	C++	GNU GPL
Metakit	C++	MIT
Microsoft SEAL	C++	MIT
Loki library	C++	Boost Software License
mlpack	C++	Apache 2.0
Mobile Robot Programming Toolkit	C++	BSD-3-Clause
Open Asset Import Library	C++	LGPL
Open Cascade libraries	C++	LGPL 2.1 only
OpenFOAM	C++	GPLv3
OpenImageIO	C++	Apache 2.0
OpenNN	C++	GPL
OpenVDB	C++	MPL-2.0
openFrameworks	C++	MIT
OpenRTM-aist	C++	LGPL-2.1
Orfeo toolbox	C++	CeCILL-2.1
OR-Tools	C++	Apache 2.0
PhysX SDK	C++	BSD-3
POCO C++ Libraries	C++	MIT
Poppler	C++	GPL-2.0-or-later
Protocol Buffers	C++	BSD-3-Clause
Qt	C++	GPL 2.0, 3.0, LGPL 3.0
QuantLib	C++	GPL-2.0
RocksDB	C++	Apache 2.0
ROOT	C++	GNU GPLv3
Scintilla	C++	MIT
Simple and Fast Multimedia Library	C++	Zlib License
Skia Graphics library	C++	BSD
Snappy	C++	BSD
Standard Template Library (STL)	C++	None (Standard C++)
Stapl	C++	BSD
SymbolicC++	C++	GNU GPL
TerraLib	C++	GPL-3.0
Tesseract OCR	C++	Apache 2.0
Threading Building Blocks	C++	Apache 2.0
ThreadWeaver	C++	GPL-2.0
TinyXML	C++	Zlib
VTD-XML	C++	Apache 2.0
wxWidgets	C++	wxWindows Library
x265	C++	GPLv2
Apache MXNet	C++, Python, Julia, R	Apache 2.0
ALGLIB	C++, C#, Python, Java, Lua	LGPL
CMU Sphinx	C++, Java	Apache 2.0
Data Analytics Library	C++, Java, Python	Apache 2.0
fastText	C++, Python	MIT
OpenCV	C++, Python, Java	Apache 2.0
Shogun (toolbox)	C++, Python, Java	GPL
Microsoft Cognitive Toolkit	C++, Python	MIT
Robot Operating System library	C++, Python, Lisp	Apache 2.0
XGBoost	C++, Python, R	Apache 2.0
Apache SINGA	Python, C++	Apache 2.0
AppJar	Python	Apache 2.0
Astropy	Python	BSD-3
Beautiful Soup	Python	MIT for version 4 and later
Biopython	Python	BSD
Chainer	Python	Apache 2.0
CatBoost	Python	Apache 2.0
CheetahTemplate	Python	MIT
Construct	Python	MIT
Cubes	Python	GPL-3.0
CuPy	Python	MIT
Dask	Python	BSD-3
DEAP	Python	MIT
DeepSpeed	Python	Apache 2.0
Genshi	Python	BSD-3
Gensim	Python	LGPL-2.1
Graph-tool	Python	GPL-3
Horovod	Python	Apache 2.0
JAX	Python	Apache 2.0
Jinja	Python	BSD-3
Keras	Python	MIT
Mako	Python	MIT
Manim	Python	MIT
Matplotlib	Python	PSF 2.0
mlpy	Python	GPL-3.0
MNE-Python	Python	BSD-3
Natural Language Toolkit	Python	Apache 2.0
NeuroKit	Python	MIT
NetworkX	Python	BSD-3
NumPy	Python	BSD-3
OceanParcels	Python	MIT
OpenAI Gym	Python	MIT
Orange	Python	GPL-3.0-or-later
Pandas	Python	BSD-3
Plotly.py	Python	MIT
ProbLog library	Python	MIT
PsychoPy	Python	GPL-3.0
pvlib python	Python	MIT
Pygame	Python	LGPL
Pyglet	Python	MIT
PyGObject	Python	LGPL-2.1 or later
PyMC	Python	Apache 2.0
Python Imaging Library	Python	Python Imaging Library License
PyroBot library	Python	MIT
PyTorch	Python	BSD-3
PyTorch Lightning	Python	Apache 2.0
Qiskit	Python	Apache 2.0
RDKit	Python	BSD-3
Requests	Python	Apache 2.0
RPyC	Python	GPL-2.0
Sage Manifolds	Python	GPL-3.0
scikit-image	Python	BSD-3
scikit-learn	Python	BSD-3
scikit-multiflow	Python	BSD-3
SciPy	Python	BSD-3
SimpleITK	Python	Apache 2.0
spaCy	Python	MIT
SQLAlchemy	Python	MIT
SQLObject	Python	MIT
Storm	Python	MIT
SymPy	Python	BSD-3
TensorFlow	Python	Apache 2.0
Theano	Python	MIT
TomoPy	Python	BSD-3
Transformers Library	Python	Apache 2.0
VPython	Python	Licenses vary
wxPython	Python	wxWindows License
XDMF	Python	BSD-3
Angular Material	TypeScript	MIT
AngularJS Material	TypeScript	MIT
D3.js	JavaScript	ISC
Babylon.js	JavaScript	Apache 2.0
BioJS	JavaScript	MIT
Blockly	JavaScript	Apache 2.0
Bootstrap	JavaScript	MIT
Chart.js	JavaScript	MIT
D3.js	JavaScript	BSD-3
Dojo Toolkit	JavaScript	BSD-3
Express.js	JavaScript	MIT
Google Closure Library	JavaScript	Apache 2.0
jQuery	JavaScript	MIT
JsRender/JsViews	JavaScript	MIT
Lodash	JavaScript	MIT
NestJS	JavaScript	MIT
MathJax	JavaScript	Apache 2.0
Polymer	JavaScript, HTML	MIT
Processing libraries	JavaScript	MIT
RGraph	JavaScript	MIT
Raphaël	JavaScript	MIT
React	JavaScript	MIT
Three.js	JavaScript	MIT
Velocity	JavaScript	MIT
Vue.js	JavaScript	MIT
Webix	JavaScript	GNU-GPL, MIT, BSD, via FLOSS
WinJS	JavaScript, TypeScript	MIT
RiTa	JavaScript, Java	GPL-3.0
Apache Ant repository	Java	Apache 2.0
Apache Calcite	Java	Apache 2.0
Apache Commons	Java	Apache 2.0
Apache CXF	Java	Apache 2.0
Apache Empire-db	Java	Apache 2.0
Apache Lucene	Java	Apache 2.0
Apache Maven	Java	Apache 2.0
Apache OpenNLP	Java	Apache 2.0
Apache PDFBox	Java	Apache 2.0
Apache Phoenix	Java	Apache 2.0
Apache POI	Java	Apache 2.0
Apache Velocity	Java	Apache 2.0
Apache Xalan	Java	Apache 2.0
Apache Xerces	Java	Apache 2.0
Apache XMLBeans	Java	Apache 2.0
BioJava	Java	LGPL-2.1
Bouncy Castle (cryptography)	Java	MIT
Cassowary	Java	MIT
Chemistry Development Kit	Java	LGPL 2.0
Colt	Java	EPL-1.0
Cytoscape	Java	LGPL-2.1
Deeplearning4j	Java	Apache 2.0
Dom4j	Java	GNU Lesser General Public License
Exp4j	Java	Apache 2.0
Flying Saucer	Java	LGPL-2.1
GNU Classpath	Java	GPL-2.0
Google Guava library	Java	Apache 2.0
Google Guice	Java	Apache 2.0
Google Web Toolkit	Java	Apache 2.0
Gson	Java	Apache 2.0
Infinispan	Java	LGPL-2.1-or-later
iText	Java	AGPL-3.0
Jackson	Java	Apache 2.0
Javolution	Java	LGPL-2.1
Java Class Library	Java	GPL-2.0
JavaFX	Java	GPL-2.0-or-later
Java OpenGL	Java, C	BSD
Jblas: Linear Algebra for Java	Java	LGPL-3
JFace	Java	EPL-2.0
JFugue	Java	Apache-2
jMusic	Java	GPL-2
jsoup	Java	MIT
JUnit	Java	EPL 2.0
LibGDX	Java	Apache 2.0
Log4j	Java	Apache 2.0
LWJGL	Java	BSD
Mallet	Java	Apache 2.0
MOEA Framework	Java	GPL-3.0
Netty	Java	Apache 2.0
Neuroph	Java	Apache 2.0
ObjectWeb ASM	Java	LGPL-3.0
OjAlgo	Java	Apache 2.0
OpenPDF	Java	GPL-2.0
Open Source Physics	Java	GPL-2.0
OpenWire	Java	Apache 2.0
Parallel Colt	Java	GPL-3.0
Parboiled	Java	Apache 2.0
Processing	Java	GPL-2.0
Quartz	Java	Apache 2.0
SLF4J	Java	MIT
Spring Batch	Java	Apache 2.0
Spring Framework	Java	Apache 2.0
StAX	Java	Apache 2.0
Standard Widget Toolkit	Java	EPL-2.0
Swing	Java	GPL-2.0-or-later
Thymeleaf	Java	Apache 2.0
XStream	Java	Apache 2.0
BioRuby	Ruby	GPL-2.0
eRuby	Ruby	MIT
Haml	Ruby	MIT
Nokogiri	Ruby	MIT
RSpec	Ruby	MIT
RubyGems	Ruby	Ruby License
Ruby on Rails	Ruby	MIT
Sinatra	Ruby	MIT
Composer	PHP	MIT
Doctrine	PHP	MIT
Guzzle	PHP	MIT
Laravel	PHP	MIT
Laminas	PHP	MIT
li3	PHP	MIT
PHPMailer	PHP	LGPL
RedBeanPHP	PHP	BSD
Simple Cloud API	PHP	Apache 2.0
SimpleXML	PHP	PHP
Symfony	PHP	MIT
Twig	PHP	BSD
XHP	PHP, Hack	MIT
Rocket	Rust	MIT
Rustls	Rust	Apache 2.0
Tokio	Rust	MIT
Standard ML Basis Library	Standard ML	MIT
FCL-Web	Pascal	GPL-2.0
Turbo Vision	Pascal, C++	MPL-1.1
Widgetset	Pascal	GPL-2.0
Free Component Library	Object Pascal	GPL
FireMonkey	Delphi, C++	not available
Free Pascal Runtime Library	Object Pascal, Delphi	GPL
Lazarus Component Library	Object Pascal	GNU GPL, GPLv2, LGPL, MPL.
GNU lightning	Assembly language, C	GPL-3.0
Libffi	Assembly language, C	MIT
Basic Linear Algebra Subprograms (BLAS)	Fortran, C, R	BSD, GPL, LGPL
LAPACK	Fortran, C	BSD
Dart core libraries	Dart	BSD-3-Clause
GORM	Go	MIT
Haskell Platform	Haskell	BSD
HaXml	Haskell	BSD-3-Clause
Parsec (parser)	Haskell	MIT
QuickCheck	Haskell	BSD-3-Clause
wxHaskell	Haskell	BSD-3-Clause
Haxe library	Haxe	MIT
INTLAB	MATLAB, GNU Octave	GPL-3.0
Torch	Lua	MIT
Flux	Julia	MIT
Owl Scientific Computing	OCaml, C	Apache 2.0
BioPerl	Perl	GPL-1.0
CPAN	Perl	Artistic-1.0
CGI.pm	Perl	Artistic License 2.0 or GPL
DBIx::Class	Perl	MIT
Gtk2-Perl	Perl	LGPL
Mojolicious	Perl	MIT
Moose	Perl	MIT
Perl Data Language	Perl	GPL-3.0
Perl DBI	Perl	Artistic License 1.0 or GPL
Perl Object Environment	Perl	GPL-2.0
Template Toolkit	Perl	GPL-1.0 or Artistic 2.0
DESeq2	R	BSD-3
igraph	R, Python, C, Ruby, MATLAB	GPL-2.0
LIBSVM	R	LGPL-3.0
R package	R	GPL-2.0
rnn	R	MIT
Common Lisp Interface Manager	Common Lisp	LGPL
Common Lisp library	Common Lisp	LGPL-2.1, others
Chicken eggs	Chicken Scheme	BSD
Perfect	Swift	Apache 2.0
Vapor	Swift	MIT

== See also ==
- Comparison of cryptography libraries
- Graphics library
- Harbour libraries and tools
- List of .NET libraries and frameworks
- List of 3D graphics libraries
- List of C++ multiple precision arithmetic libraries
- List of C++ template libraries
- List of Java frameworks
- List of JavaScript libraries
- List of numerical libraries
- List of open-source programming languages
- Lists of programming software development tools
- List of Ajax frameworks
- List of WebGL frameworks
- Shared library
