= List of C++ template libraries =

The following list of C++ template libraries details the various libraries of templates available for the C++ programming language.

The choice of a typical library depends on a diverse range of requirements such as: desired features (e.g.: large dimensional linear algebra, parallel computation, partial differential equations), commercial/opensource nature, readability of API, portability or platform/compiler dependence (e.g.: Linux, Windows, Visual C++, GCC), performance in speed, ease-of-use, continued support from developers, standard compliance, specialized optimization in code for specific application scenarios or even the size of the code-base to be installed.

== General ==
- Abseil (C++ libraries)
- Active Template Library (Windows)
- Adaptive Communication Environment
- Adobe Source Libraries
- AGG (anti-aliased rendering library)
- Boost
- CGAL – Computational Geometry Algorithms Library
- Concurrent Collections for C++ (CnC)
- Dlib
- Embedded Template Library
- IT++
- KFRlib Audio and DSP library with extensive use of template expressions.
- Loki
- mlpack – machine learning
- Oracle Template Library
- PETSc – Portable, Extensible Toolkit for Scientific Computation
- POCO C++ Libraries
- Template Numerical Toolkit
- Threading Building Blocks (TBB)
- Windows Template Library
- Windows Runtime Library

== Standard Template Library and derivates ==
- Standard Template Library
- GNU C++ Standard Library (libstdc++)
- libc++, part of clang++
- STAPL
- EASTL

== Linear Algebra ==
- Armadillo C++ Library
- Blitz++
- Eigen Library
- Matrix Template Library
- Trilinos

== See also ==
- List of compilers § C++ compilers
- C++ Standard Library
