= List of C++ multi-threading libraries =

List of multi-threading libraries
- Written in: C++
- Type: library or framework

List of cross-platform multi-threading libraries for the C++ programming language.

- C++ Standard Library threading
- Apache Portable Runtime
- Boost.Thread
- Dlib
- HPX
- IPP
- OpenMP
- OpenThreads
- Parallel Patterns Library
- POCO C++ Libraries Threading
- POSIX Threads
- Qt QThread
- Rogue Wave SourcePro Threads Module
- Stapl
- TBB
