= Abseil (C++ libraries) =

Collection of C++ libraries

- Developer: Google
- Initial release: September 26, 2017; 8 years ago
- Written in: C++
- Operating system: Cross-platform
- Type: Libraries
- License: Apache 2.0
- Website: abseil.io
- Repository: github.com/abseil/abseil-cpp

Abseil is a set of open-source template libraries for the C++ programming language developed by Google. Its components were drawn from the fundamental pieces of Google’s internal software codebase, and provide generic support utilities for common tasks and data structures such as associative arrays, search trees, string manipulation, command-line flag processing, hash functions, pseudorandom number generation, logging, debugging, option types and template metaprogramming.

It is used extensively by C++ applications within Google, including the Chromium web browser and the RE2 regular expression engine.

Similar to the Boost C++ libraries, Abseil extends the functionality of the C++ standard library, and some APIs which were initially created as part of Abseil later became incorporated into the standard library.

Bindings for the Python programming language are also available.

== See also ==
- Boost (C++ libraries)
- POCO C++ Libraries, a similarly general-purpose C++ library
- Folly (software library), a similar template library developed by Meta Platforms
- List of C++ template libraries
