= CAPD =

CAPD may refer to:

- China Association for Promoting Democracy
- CAPD library (Computer Assisted Proofs in Dynamics), a software library
- Central auditory processing disorder, a group of disorders impairing the processing of auditory information
- Continuous ambulatory peritoneal dialysis, a form of artificial kidney dialysis
