= NSPR =

NSPR may stand for:

- Netscape Portable Runtime, a cross-platform abstraction layer library for the C programming language
- North State Public Radio, a public radio broadcaster in the Northern California, United States
