= BDW =

BDW is a three-letter acronym that may refer to:

- Bart De Wever (born 1970), Flemish Belgian politician
- Billy Dee Williams (born 1937), American actor
- Brandon deWilde (1942–1972), American actor
- Brian Douglas Wilson (1942–2025), American musician
- Boehm–Demers–Weiser garbage collector, in computer science
- The Book of Divine Worship, a religious text
- Banking Data Warehouse, a reference model for banking, an IBM product
- Bundesverband deutscher Wasserkraftwerke or Federal Association of German Hydroelectric Power Plants, Germany
- Business Data Warehouse, a data warehousing service
- Big Daddy Weave, a contemporary Christian band
