= Apache Portable Runtime =

Supporting library for the Apache web server

- Developer(s): Apache Software Foundation
- Stable release: 1.7.4 / April 16, 2023; 23 months ago
- Repository: github.com/apache/apr
- Written in: C
- Operating system: Cross-platform
- Type: Development library
- License: Apache License 2.0
- Website: apr.apache.org

The Apache Portable Runtime (APR) is a supporting library for the Apache web server. It provides a set of APIs that map to the underlying operating system (OS). Where the OS does not support a particular function, APR will provide an emulation. Thus programmers can use the APR to make a program truly portable across platforms.

APR originally formed a part of Apache HTTP Server, but the Apache Software Foundation spun it off into a separate project. Other applications can use it to achieve platform independence.

== Functionality ==
The range of platform-independent functionality provided by APR includes:

- Memory allocation and memory pool functionality
- Atomic operations
- Dynamic library handling
- File I/O
- Command-argument parsing
- Locking
- Hash tables and arrays
- Mmap functionality
- Network sockets and protocols
- Thread, process and mutex functionality
- Shared memory functionality
- Skip list functionality
- Time routines
- User and group ID services

== Similar projects ==
- GLib – provides similar functionality. It supports many more data structures and OS-independent functions, but fewer IPC-related functions. (GLib lacks local and global locking and shared-memory management.)
- Netscape Portable Runtime (NSPR) is a cross-platform abstraction library used by the Mozilla project. It is used by another subproject of Mozilla application framework (XPFE) to provide cross-platform graphical user interface (GUI) functionality.
- Adaptive Communication Environment (ACE) is an object-oriented library written in C++ similar in functionality to APR. It is widely deployed in commercial products.
- commonc++ is a cross-platform C++ class library for systems programming, with much of the same functionality as APR.
- POCO is a modern C++ framework similar in concept but more extensive than APR.
- wxWidgets is an object-oriented cross-platform GUI library that also provides abstraction classes for database communication, IPC and networking functionality.
- KDE Frameworks – used by KDE SC
