= Drogon (software) =

C++ web application framework

- Developer: An Tao
- Release: April 27, 2018; 8 years ago
- Stable release: 1.9.13 / May 7, 2026; 4 months ago
- Written in: C++
- Operating system: Linux, macOS, FreeBSD, Windows
- Type: Web framework
- License: MIT License
- Website: drogon.org
- Repository: github.com/drogonframework/drogon

Drogon is a HTTP application framework written in the C++ programming language, supporting either C++20 or C++17 with Boost. Drogon can be used to build various web application server programs using C++. It is a cross-platform framework, supporting Linux, macOS, FreeBSD, OpenBSD, HaikuOS and Windows.

The name Drogon comes from the dragon named Drogon in the TV series Game of Thrones.

In May 2020, Drogon has won the first place in the TechEmpower benchmark Round 19 Composite framework score.
