= JMusic =

Music programming software

jMusic is an open source music programming library written in the Java programming language. Written by Johannes Vazha Tavdgiridze and Andrew Brown, jMusic was released publicly in November 1998. It is under GNU GPL license.

It is designed to assist composers and music software developers by providing support for music data structures, modifications, and input/output to various file formats. It can display notes as sheet music (see music notation).

jMusic has a data structure that is based on a musical score metaphor, and consists of a hierarchy of notes, phrases, parts and score. jMusic also has a sound synthesis architecture and "instruments" can be created from a chain of "audio objects" (similar to unit generators in other languages). A jMusic score can be rendered with jMusic instruments to an audio file.

== Code Sample ==
Output: C and D

 Note n = new Note(C4, CROTCHET);  // Middle C (quarter note)
 Note n2 = new Note(G4, CROTCHET);
 
 Phrase p = new Phrase();
 p.addNote(n);                     // Add C
 p.addNote(n2);                    // Add G#

== See also ==
- Sound Object (SndObj) Library
