= HPX =

Scientific computing program

- Developers: The STEllAR Group, archived from the original on 2019-04-03; LSU Center for Computation and Technology
- Release: 2008
- Stable release: 1.11.0 / June 29, 2025; 14 months ago
- Written in: C++
- Operating system: Microsoft Windows; Linux; Mac OS X
- Type: Partitioned global address space Parallel programming Runtime System
- License: Boost Software License
- Website: hpx.stellar-group.org
- Repository: github.com/STEllAR-GROUP/hpx

HPX, short for High Performance ParalleX, is a runtime system for high-performance computing. It is currently under active development by the STE||AR group at Louisiana State University. Focused on scientific computing, it provides an alternative execution model to conventional approaches such as MPI. HPX aims to overcome the challenges MPI faces with increasing large supercomputers by using asynchronous communication between nodes and lightweight control objects instead of global barriers, allowing application developers to exploit fine-grained parallelism.

HPX is developed in idiomatic C++ and released as open source under the Boost Software License, which allows usage in commercial applications.

== Applications ==
Though designed as a general-purpose environment for high-performance computing, HPX has primarily been used in

- Astrophysics simulation, including the N-body problem, neutron star evolution, and the merging of stars
  - Octo-Tiger, An astrophysics application simulating the evolution of star systems.
- LibGeoDecomp, A Library for Geometric Decomposition codes
- Simulation crack and fractures utilizing Peridynamics
- Phylanx, A Library for Distributed Array Processing
