= XDMF =

Data format for high-performance computing

eXtensible Data Model and Format
- Filename extensions: xmf, xdmf
- Type of format: scientific data format
- Website: xdmf.org

XDMF (eXtensible Data Model and Format) provides a standard way to access data produced by HPC codes. Data format refers to the raw data to be manipulated, the description of the data is separate from the values themselves. It distinguishes the metadata (Light data) and the values themselves (Heavy data). Light data is stored using XML, Heavy data is stored using HDF5, so some information is stored redundantly in both XML and HDF5. APIs to read and write XDMF exists for multiple programing languages.
