= Component-integrated ACE ORB =

The Component-Integrated ACE ORB (CIAO) is a CORBA component model (CCM) implementation built on top of TAO.

CIAO is currently aiming to provide component-oriented paradigm to the distributed, real-time, embedded (DRE) system developers by abstracting DRE-critical systemic aspects, such as quality of service requirements, RT policies, as installable/configurable units supported by the component framework. Promoting these DRE-critical aspects as first-class metadata disentangles code for controlling these non-function aspects from application logic and makes DRE system development more flexible. Since mechanisms to support various DRE-critical non-functional aspects can be easily verified, CIAO will also make configuring and managing these aspects easier.

CIAO also provides an implementation of the AMI4CCM standard which provides the ability to perform asynchronous operations using a callback model. AMI4CCM is a separate OMG standard.

CIAO also provides an implementation of the DDS4CCM standard which integrates DDS as publish-subscribe middleware into the component model. The CIAO DDS4CCM implementation supports RTI Connext DDS and OpenDDS as underlying DDS implementations.

AXCIOMA is the open source successor for CIAO. By making benefit of the IDL to C++11 language mapping AXCIOMA is much easier to use as compared to CIAO. AXCIOMA implements also AMI4CCM and DDS4CCM.

== See also ==
- TAO
