= DEAP (software) =

- Original author(s): François-Michel De Rainville, Félix-Antoine Fortin, Marc-André Gardner, Marc Parizeau, Christian Gagné
- Developer(s): François-Michel De Rainville, Félix-Antoine Fortin, Marc-André Gardner
- Initial release: 2009
- Stable release: 1.4.1 / 21 July 2023; 19 months ago
- Repository: github.com/DEAP/deap
- Written in: Python
- Operating system: Cross-platform
- Type: Evolutionary computation framework
- License: LGPL
- Website: github.com/deap

Distributed Evolutionary Algorithms in Python (DEAP) is an evolutionary computation framework for rapid prototyping and testing of ideas. It incorporates the data structures and tools required to implement most common evolutionary computation techniques such as genetic algorithm, genetic programming, evolution strategies, particle swarm optimization, differential evolution, traffic flow and estimation of distribution algorithm. It is developed at Université Laval since 2009.

== Example ==
The following code gives a quick overview how the Onemax problem optimization with genetic algorithm can be implemented with DEAP.

import array
import random
from deap import creator, base, tools, algorithms

creator.create("FitnessMax", base.Fitness, weights=(1.0,))
creator.create("Individual", array.array, typecode="b", fitness=creator.FitnessMax)

toolbox = base.Toolbox()
toolbox.register("attr_bool", random.randint, 0, 1)
toolbox.register(
    "individual", tools.initRepeat, creator.Individual, toolbox.attr_bool, 100
)
toolbox.register("population", tools.initRepeat, list, toolbox.individual)

evalOneMax = lambda individual: (sum(individual),)

toolbox.register("evaluate", evalOneMax)
toolbox.register("mate", tools.cxTwoPoint)
toolbox.register("mutate", tools.mutFlipBit, indpb=0.05)
toolbox.register("select", tools.selTournament, tournsize=3)

population = toolbox.population(n=300)
NGEN = 40

for gen in range(NGEN):
    offspring = algorithms.varAnd(population, toolbox, cxpb=0.5, mutpb=0.1)
    fits = toolbox.map(toolbox.evaluate, offspring)
    for fit, ind in zip(fits, offspring):
        ind.fitness.values = fit
    population = offspring

== See also ==
- Python SCOOP (software)
