= Microsoft SEAL =

Homomorphic encryption library

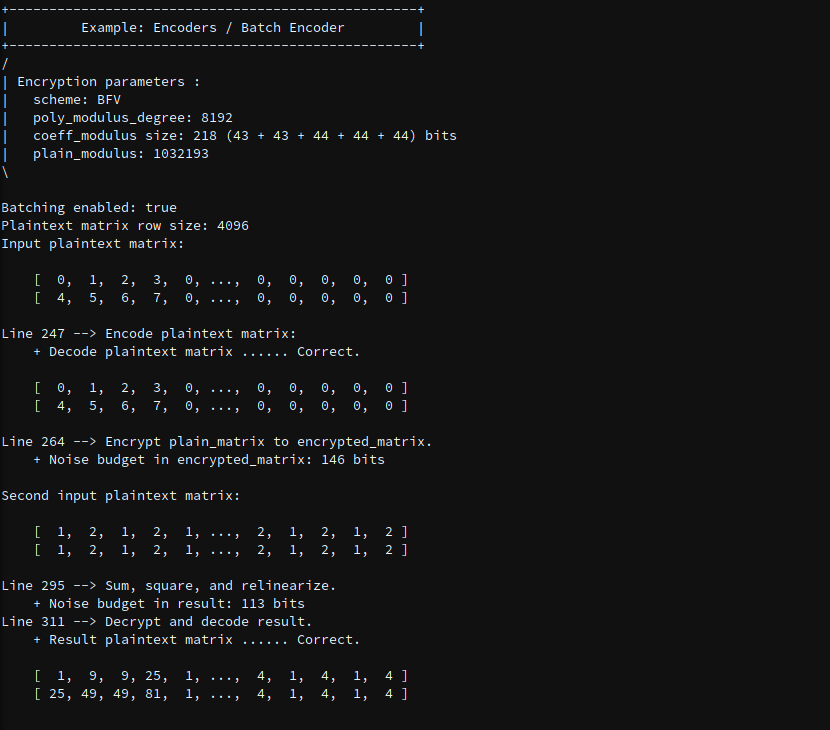
- Developer: Microsoft Research
- Release: December 3, 2018; 7 years ago
- Stable release: 4.4.5 / September 14, 2026; 9 days ago
- Written in: C++
- Operating system: Microsoft Windows, macOS, Linux, Android
- Platform: IA-32, x86-64, ARM64
- Type: Homomorphic encryption library
- License: MIT License
- Website: www.microsoft.com/en-us/research/project/microsoft-seal
- Repository: github.com/Microsoft/SEAL

Simple Encrypted Arithmetic Library or SEAL is a free and open-source cross platform software library developed by Microsoft Research that implements various forms of homomorphic encryption.

== History ==
Development originally came out of the Cryptonets paper, demonstrating that artificial intelligence algorithms could be run on homomorphically encrypted data.

It is open-source (under the MIT License) and written in standard C++ without external dependencies and so it can be compiled cross platform. An official .NET wrapper written in C# is available and makes it easier for .NET applications to interact with SEAL.

== Features ==
=== Algorithms ===
Microsoft SEAL supports both asymmetric and symmetric (added in version 3.4) encryption algorithms.

=== Scheme types ===
Microsoft SEAL comes with two different homomorphic encryption schemes with very different properties:

- BFV: The BFV scheme allows modular arithmetic to be performed on encrypted integers. For applications where exact values are necessary, the BFV scheme is the only choice.
- CKKS: The CKKS scheme allows additions and multiplications on encrypted real or complex numbers, but yields only approximate results. In applications such as summing up encrypted real numbers, evaluating machine learning models on encrypted data, or computing distances of encrypted locations CKKS is going to be by far the best choice.

=== Compression ===
Data compression can be achieved by building SEAL with Zlib support. By default, data is compressed using the DEFLATE algorithm which achieves significant memory footprint savings when serializing objects such as encryption parameters, ciphertexts, plaintexts, and all available keys: Public, Secret, Relin (relinearization), and Galois. Compression can always be disabled.

== Availability ==
There are several known ports of SEAL to other languages in active development:

=== C++ ===
- Microsoft SEAL (Microsoft's source)

=== C#/F# ===
- NuGet (Microsoft's official package)

=== Python ===
- PySEAL
- SEAL-Python
- tf-seal
- Pyfhel

=== JavaScript ===
- node-seal
- sealjs

=== TypeScript ===
- node-seal
