= SymbolicC++ =

Computer algebra system

- Developers: Yorick Hardy, Willi-Hans Steeb and Tan Kiat Shi
- Stable release: 3.35 / September 15, 2010; 15 years ago
- Written in: C++
- Operating system: Cross-platform
- Type: Mathematical software
- License: GPL
- Website: http://issc.uj.ac.za/symbolic/symbolic.html

SymbolicC++ is a general purpose computer algebra system written in the programming language C++. It is free software released under the terms of the GNU General Public License. SymbolicC++ is used by including a C++ header file or by linking against a library.

== Examples ==
import "symbolicc++.h";

import std;

using namespace std;

int main() {
    Symbolic x("x");
    std::println("{}", integrate(x+1, x)); // => 1/2*x^(2)+x
    Symbolic y("y");
    std::println("{}", df(y, x)); // => 0
    std::println("{}", df(y[x], x)); // => df(y[x],x)
    std::println("{}", df(std::exp(std::cos(y[x])), x)); // => -sin(y[x])*df(y[x],x)*e^cos(y[x])
 return 0;
}

The following program fragment inverts the matrix
$$\begin{pmatrix}
\cos\theta & \sin\theta\\
-\sin\theta & \cos\theta
\end{pmatrix}$$
symbolically.

Symbolic theta("theta");
Symbolic r = {
    { std::cos(theta), std::sin(theta) },
    { -std::sin(theta), std::cos(theta) } 
};
std::println(r(0, 1)); // sin(theta)
Symbolic rInv = r.inverse();
std::println(rInv[ (std::cos(theta) ^ 2) == 1 - (std::sin(theta) ^ 2) ]);

The output is

[ cos(theta) −sin(theta) ]
[ sin(theta) cos(theta)  ]

The next program illustrates non-commutative symbols in SymbolicC++. Here b is a Bose annihilation operator and bd is a Bose creation operator. The variable vs denotes the vacuum state $|0\rangle$. The ~ operator toggles the commutativity of a variable, i.e. if b is commutative that ~b is non-commutative and if b is non-commutative ~b is commutative.

import "symbolicc++.h";
import std;

int main() {
    // The operator b is the annihilation operator and bd is the creation operator
    Symbolic b("b");
    Symbolic bd("bd");
    Symbolic vs("vs");

    b = ~b;
    bd = ~bd;
    vs = ~vs;

    Equations rules = (b * bd == bd * b + 1, b * vs == 0);

    // Example 1
    Symbolic result1 = b * bd * b *bd;
    std::println("result1 = {}", result1.subst_all(rules));
    std::println("result1 * vs = {}", (result1 * vs).subst_all(rules));

    // Example 2
    Symbolic result2 = (b + bd) ^ 4;
    std::println("result2 = {}", result2.subst_all(rules));
    std::println("result2 * vs = {}", (result2 * vs).subst_all(rules));

    return 0;
}

Further examples can be found in the books listed below.

== History ==
SymbolicC++ is described in a series of books on computer algebra. The first book described the first version of SymbolicC++. In this version the main data type for symbolic computation was the Sum class. The list of available classes included

- Verylong: An unbounded integer implementation (like BigInteger)
- Rational: A template class for rational numbers
- Quaternion: A template class for quaternions
- Derive: A template class for automatic differentiation
- Vector: A template class for vectors (see vector space)
- Matrix: A template class for matrices (see matrix (mathematics))
- Sum: A template class for symbolic expressions

Example:

import "rational.h";
import "msymbol.h";
import std;

int main(void) {
    Sum<int> x("x", 1);
    Sum<Rational<int>> y("y", 1);
    std::println("{}", Int(y, y)); // => 1/2 yˆ2
    y.depend(x);
    std::println("{}", df(y, x)); // => df(y,x)
    return 0;
}

The second version of SymbolicC++ featured new classes such as the Polynomial class and initial support for simple integration. Support for the algebraic computation of Clifford algebras was described in using SymbolicC++ in 2002. Subsequently, support for Gröbner bases was added. The third version features a complete rewrite of SymbolicC++ and was released in 2008. This version encapsulates all symbolic expressions in the Symbolic class.

Newer versions are available from the SymbolicC++ website.

== See also ==
- Comparison of computer algebra systems
- GiNaC
