= LAS file format =

For interchange of Lidar point cloud data

LAS
- Filename extension: .las
- Internet media type: application/vnd.las
- Magic number: LASF
- Developed by: American Society for Photogrammetry and Remote Sensing
- Initial release: May 9, 2003; 23 years ago
- Latest release: 1.4 R15; July 9, 2019; 7 years ago
- Type of format: Point cloud data
- Open format?: Yes

The LAS (LASer) format is a file format designed for the interchange and archiving of Lidar point cloud data. It is an open, binary format specified by the American Society for Photogrammetry and Remote Sensing (ASPRS). The format is widely used and regarded as an industry standard for Lidar data.

== File structure ==
A LAS file consists of the following overall sections:

Section	Description
Public header block	Describes format, number of points, extent of the point cloud and other generic data.
Variable length records (VLR)	Any number of optional records to provide various data such as the spatial reference system used, metadata, waveform packet information and user application data. Each VLR can hold a data payload of up to 65,535 bytes in length.
Point data records	Data for each of the individual points in the point cloud, including coordinates, classification (e.g. terrain or building), flight and scan data, etc.
Extended variable length records (EVLR)	Introduced with LAS 1.3, EVLRs are similar to VLRs but are located after the point data records and allow a much larger data payload per record due to the use of 8-byte size descriptors.

=== Point data records ===
A LAS file contains point records in one of the point data record formats defined by the LAS specification; as of LAS 1.4, there are 11 point data record formats (0 through 10) available. All point data records must be of the same format within the file. The various formats differ in the data fields available, such as GPS time, RGB and NIR color and wave packet information.

The 3D point coordinates are represented within the point data records by 32-bit integers, to which a scaling and offset defined in the public header must be applied in order to obtain the actual coordinates.

As the number of bytes used per point data record is explicitly given in the public header block, it is possible to add user-defined fields in "extra bytes" to the fields given by the specification-defined point data record formats. A standardized way of interpreting such extra bytes was introduced in the LAS 1.4 specification, in the form of a specific EVLR.

== Derivative formats ==
=== LAZ ===
LAZ is an open format for lossless compression of LAS files developed by Martin Isenburg, author of its original LASzip reference implementation. The size of a LAZ file is typically 7 to 25 percent of the corresponding LAS file, and it has become a de facto industry standard for compressed point cloud data.

LAZ files are similar in structure to the corresponding uncompressed LAS files, except the point data records are replaced by chunks of compressed point data.

LASzip was originally published under the GNU LGPL, but relicensed under the Apache Public License 2.0 in late 2021. Alternative LAZ implementations include LAZperf and laz-rs.

=== COPC ===
The Cloud Optimized Point Cloud (COPC) format specified by Hobu, Inc. is a cloud-optimized variant of LAZ, analogous to the COG format's relationship to GeoTIFF. A COPC file guarantees a restricted structure of the LAZ file to make its data chunks correspond to nodes in an octree, making the file suitable for subset requests.
