= List of C++ multiple precision arithmetic libraries =

The following is an incomplete list of some arbitrary-precision arithmetic libraries for C++.

- GMP (Note: C++ support must be enabled with --enable-cxx during the building of GMP)
- MPFR
- MPIR
- TTMath
- Arbitrary Precision Math C++ Package
- Class Library for Numbers
- Number Theory Library
- Apfloat
- C++ Big Integer Library
- MAPM
- ARPREC
- InfInt
- Universal Numbers
- mp++
- num7
- slimcpplib
