= LibLAS =

BSD-licensed C++ library for reading/writing ASPRS LAS lidar data

libLAS
- Developers: Howard Butler, Mateusz Loskot, Phil Vachon, Martin Vales, Frank Warmerdam
- Stable release: 1.8.1 / 23 August 2016; 9 years ago
- Written in: C++
- Operating system: Linux, Mac OS X, Microsoft Windows
- Platform: Cross-platform
- Type: Library
- License: BSD
- Website: liblas.org
- Repository: github.com/libLAS/libLAS

libLAS is a library for reading and writing geospatial data encoded in the ASPRS laser (LAS) file format, versions 1.0, 1.1 and 1.2. LAS-formatted data is heavily used in lidar processing operations. The LAS format is a sequential binary format used to store data from sensors and as intermediate processing storage by some applications.

libLAS software consists of base library with multiple application programming interfaces available for programming languages like C, C++, Python as well as languages available in .NET Framework and Mono. Also, a variety of useful command-line utilities is provided for translating LAS files from one version of the LAS format to another, inspecting header information, and translating LAS data to and from text.

Initial development of libLAS software was supported by the Iowa Geological Survey of the Iowa DNR for use in its statewide lidar project.
