= TinyXML =

Lightweight C++ XML parser library

- Developer: Lee Thomason
- Stable release: 11.0.0 / March 15, 2025; 8 months ago
- Repository: github.com/leethomason/tinyxml2
- Written in: C++
- Type: API
- License: zlib License
- Website: leethomason.github.io/tinyxml2/index.html

TinyXML is a small, simple, operating system-independent XML parser for the C++ language. It is free and open source software, distributed under the terms of the zlib License.

== Features ==
The principal impetus for TinyXML is its size, as the name suggests. It parses the XML into a DOM-like tree. It can both read and write XML files.

It is written in C++98, and does not rely on the C++ Standard Library. It makes no use of exceptions or run-time type information.

TinyXML-2 improves on TinyXML-1 and replaces it entirely, using less memory, less allocations, and having faster performance. TinyXML-2 further improved on the library's usability for applications with minimal XML requirements, such as video games.

== Limitations ==
- TinyXML is minimalistic, and is not W3C standards-compliant, or comprehensive like Simple API for XML, and not ideal for browsers or any application requiring complete XML coverage.
- TinyXML does not process DTDs, either internal or external. So XML files that rely upon DTD-defined entities will not parse correctly in TinyXML.
- Though it does handle processing instructions, it has no facilities for handling XSLT stylesheet declarations. That is, it does not apply an XSLT declared in a stylesheet processing instruction to the XML file when parsing it.
- Further, TinyXML has no facility for handling XML namespaces. Qualified element or attribute names retain their prefixes, as TinyXML makes no effort to match the prefixes with namespaces.
- In terms of encodings, it only handles files using UTF-8 or an unspecified form of ASCII similar to Latin-1.
