= KFRlib =

Framework for Digital Signal Processing

- Developer(s): KFRlib
- Stable release: 6.1.1 / January 13, 2025; 2 months ago
- Written in: C++
- Operating system: OS X, Linux, Microsoft Windows, iOS, Android
- Type: library or framework
- License: Proprietary, GPL
- Website: www.kfrlib.com

KFRlib is an open-source cross-platform C++ DSP framework written in C++. It is covered by a dual GPL/commercial license.

== Official support ==
=== Supported platforms ===
KFR is supported on the following platforms.

- Mac OS X
- Linux
- Microsoft Windows
- iOS
- Android

=== Supported compilers ===
- Xcode 6.3 and later
- Clang 3.6 and later
- Visual Studio 2015 using LLVM-vs2014 toolkit

== Features ==
- Optimized for ARM NEON, SSE, SSE2, SSE3, SSSE3, SSE4.1, SSE4.2, AVX, AVX2 instruction sets
- Fast Fourier transform
- Convolution
- Finite impulse response filters
- Infinite impulse response filters
- Digital biquad filter
- Sample rate conversion
- Window function
- Goertzel algorithm
- Digital delay line
- Pseudorandom number generator
- SIMD versions of many C mathematical functions
