= Blitz++ =

- Original author: Todd Veldhuizen
- Stable release: 1.0.2 / October 2, 2019; 6 years ago
- Written in: C++
- Type: Library and framework
- Website: github.com/blitzpp/blitz
- Repository: github.com/blitzpp/blitz

Blitz++ is a high-performance vector mathematics library written in C++. This library is intended for use in scientific applications that might otherwise be implemented with Fortran or MATLAB.

Blitz++ utilizes advanced C++ template metaprogramming techniques, including expression templates, to provide speed-optimized mathematical operations on sequences of data without sacrificing the natural syntax provided by other mathematical programming systems. Indeed, it has been recognized as a pioneer in the area of C++ template metaprogramming.

== See also ==
- List of open-source mathematical libraries
