= LIVE555 =

- Developers: Live Networks, Inc.
- Written in: C++
- Operating system: Unix, Windows, QNX, Linux
- Type: Library
- License: LGPL
- Website: www.live555.com

LIVE555 Streaming Media is a set of open source (LGPL) C++ libraries developed by Live Networks, Inc. for multimedia streaming. The libraries support open standards such as RTP/RTCP and RTSP for streaming, and can also manage video RTP payload formats such as H.264, H.265, MPEG, VP8, and DV, and audio RTP payload formats such as MPEG, AAC, AMR, AC-3 and Vorbis. It is used internally by well-known software such as VLC and mplayer.

The software distribution also includes a complete RTSP server application, RTSP clients and a RTSP proxy server.
