= Oracle Template Library =

C++ library for database access

- Original author(s): Sergei Kuchin
- Written in: C++
- Type: library or framework
- License: BSD-style license
- Website: otl.sourceforge.net

The Oracle, ODBC, and DB2 CLI Template Library (OTL) is a C++ library for database access, written by Sergei Kuchin. The OTL exists since 1996. It consists of a single header file. Besides Oracle, the OTL supports DB2 (natively), and various database systems now, directly or indirectly, via ODBC.
