= GiNaC =

Computer algebra system

- Developers: Christian Bauer, Richard B. Kreckel, Alexei Sheplyakov, Jens Vollinga, et al.
- Initial release: 26 November 1999; 26 years ago
- Stable release: 1.8.10 / 11 February 2026; 3 days ago
- Written in: C++
- Operating system: Cross-platform
- Type: Mathematical software
- License: GNU General Public License
- Website: www.ginac.de
- Repository: www.ginac.de/ginac.git

GiNaC is a free computer algebra system released under the GNU General Public License. The name is a recursive acronym for "GiNaC is Not a CAS" (Computer Algebra System). This is similar to the GNU acronym "GNU's not Unix".

What distinguishes GiNaC from most other computer algebra systems is that it does not provide a high-level interface for user interaction. Rather, it encourages its users to write symbolic algorithms directly in C++, which is GiNaC's implementation programming language. The algebraic syntax is achieved in C++ through the use of operator overloading. The name GiNaC is also explained by its developers' perception that most "computer algebra systems" put too much emphasis on a high-level interface and too little on interoperability.

GiNaC uses the CLN library for implementing arbitrary-precision arithmetic. Symbolically, it can do multivariate polynomial arithmetic, factor polynomials, compute GCDs, expand series, and compute with matrices. It is equipped to handle certain noncommutative algebras which are extensively used in theoretical high energy physics—Clifford algebras, SU(3) Lie algebras, and Lorentz tensors—and can evaluate a wide range of multiple polylogarithms. Due to this, it is extensively used in dimensional regularization computations – but it is not restricted to physics.

GiNaC is the symbolic foundation in several open-source projects: there is a symbolic extension for GNU Octave, a simulator for magnetic resonance imaging, and since May 2009, Pynac, a fork of GiNaC, provides the backend for symbolic expressions in SageMath.

== See also ==
- Comparison of computer algebra systems
