= Libx (graphics library) =

LibX
- Developer(s): Christian Oberholzer and Basil Fierz
- Stable release: 1.0 / March 16, 2008
- Operating system: Cross-platform
- Type: Graphics library
- License: LGPL
- Website: https://sourceforge.net/projects/libx/

LibX is a platform-independent C++ software library used to provide handling of DirectX .X files.

It's mainly built of two statically linked libraries and one executable demonstrating the capability to load models and render them using OpenGL. The two libraries are:

== libx_core ==
This one parses the actual file and generates an in-memory-representation of the file content (similar to a .xml DOM tree.)

== libx_model ==
This library can convert the generated file-representation into a format suitable for rendering, specifically:

- converting indices to 16bit representation if possible
- reordering streams of normals, positions, etc. so that they are indexable with one index for each vertex
- convert quad-faces to triangles
- etc.
