= CAPD library =

C++ module software library

- Developer(s): Jagiellonian University
- Initial release: 2005
- Stable release: 6.0.0 / 31 January 2024; 13 months ago
- Repository: github.com/CAPDgroup/CAPD
- Written in: C++
- Operating system: Multi-platform
- Type: Application framework
- License: GPL
- Website: capd.ii.uj.edu.pl

The CAPD library (Computer Assisted Proofs in Dynamics) is a software library that aims to provide a set of flexible C++ modules designed for rigorous numerics in Dynamical Systems and homology computation. It has been used in a research of chaotic dynamics, bifurcations, heteroclinic/homoclinic solutions and periodic orbits. The RedHom (Reduction Homology) subproject provides efficient methods for computation of a homology of sets based on geometric and algebraic reductions.

The CAPD library is developed at the Faculty of Mathematics and Computer Science at the Jagiellonian University. The software is available under an open source GPL license.
