= Sound Object Library =

Object-oriented programming library

Sound Object (SndObj) Library
- Written in: C++
- Type: library or framework
- License: GNU General Public License

The Sound Object (SndObj) Library is a C++ object-oriented programming library for music and audio development. It is composed of 100+ classes for signal processing, audio, MIDI, and file I/O. The library is available for Linux, Windows, Mac OS X, IRIX, and other Unix-like systems.

The library development is now a cooperative project hosted by SourceForge. New versions are released twice-yearly and development versions are available via Concurrent Versions System (CVS).

The Library also provides bindings for Python (aka PySndObj), Java and Common Lisp (through CFFI).
