= Dlib =

Cross-platform software library

- Original author: Davis E. King
- Release: 2002
- Stable release: 20.0.1 / 29 March 2026; 6 months ago
- Written in: C++
- Operating system: Cross-platform
- Type: Library, machine learning
- License: Boost
- Website: dlib.net
- Repository: github.com/davisking/dlib

Dlib is a general purpose cross-platform software library written in the programming language C++. Its design is heavily influenced by ideas from design by contract and component-based software engineering. Thus it is, first and foremost, a set of independent software components. It is open-source software released under a Boost Software License.

Since development began in 2002, Dlib has grown to include a wide variety of tools. As of 2016, it contains software components for dealing with networking, threads, graphical user interfaces, data structures, linear algebra, machine learning, image processing, data mining, XML and text parsing, numerical optimization, Bayesian networks, and many other tasks. In recent years, much of the development has been focused on creating a broad set of statistical machine learning tools and in 2009 Dlib was published in the Journal of Machine Learning Research. Since then it has been used in a wide range of domains.

== See also ==
- Comparison of deep learning software
- Comparison of machine learning software
