= Orfeo Toolbox =

Software library for satellite image processing

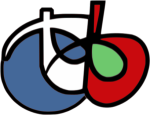
- Developer: CNES
- Written in: C++, Python
- Type: Library
- License: Apache-2.0
- Website: orfeo-toolbox.org

Orfeo Toolbox (OTB) is a software library for processing images from Earth observation satellites.

OTB was initiated by the French space agency (CNES) in 2006. The software is released under a free licence; a number of contributors outside CNES are taking part in development and integrating into other projects.

The library was originally targeted at high resolution images acquired by the Orfeo constellation: Pléiades and Cosmo-Skymed, but it also handles other sensors.

== Purpose ==
OTB provides:

- Image access: read/write access for most remote sensing image formats (using GDAL), meta-data access, visualization
- Data access: vector data access (shapefile, kml), DEM model, lidar data
- Filtering: blurring, denoising, enhancement for optical or radar data
- Feature extraction: texture computations including Haralick, SFS, Pantex, Edge density, points of interest, alignments, lines, SIFT, SURF
- Image segmentation: region growing, watershed, level sets
- Classification: K-means, SVM, Markov random fields and access to all OpenCV machine learning algorithms
- Change detection
- Stereo reconstruction from images
- Orthorectification and map projections (using ossim)
- Radiometric indices (vegetation, water, soil)
- Object-based segmentation and filtering
- PCA computation
- Visualization: a flexible visualization system, customizable via plugins;

== Languages and interaction with other software ==
OTB is a C++ library, based on Insight toolkit (ITK). Bindings are developed for Python. A method to use OTB components within IDL/ENVI has been published. One of the OTB user defined a procedure to use the library capabilities from MATLAB.

Since late 2009, some modules are developed as processing plugins for QGIS. Modules for classification, segmentation, hill shading have provided. This effort relies only on volunteers.

OTB algorithms were available in QGIS through the processing framework Sextante. Since March 2024, a QGIS plugin is now available in QGIS catalog to work with an installed OTB software.

== Applications ==
Additionally to the library, several applications with GUI are distributed. These application enable interactive segmentation, orthorectification, classification, image registration, etc...

== Monteverdi (version 1 and 2) ==
The OTB-Applications package makes available a set of simple software tools . It supports raster and vector data and integrates most of the already existing OTB applications. The architecture takes advantage of the streaming and multi-threading capabilities of the OTB pipeline. It also uses features such as processing on demand and automagic file format I/O. The application is called Monteverdi.

In 2013, Monteverdi software was revamped into a new software called Monteverdi2.

Since OTB version 9.0 Monterverdi is no longer packaged and supported. However a QGIS plugin allow to use otb application with GUI.

== License ==
OTB was initially distributed under the French Open Source license CeCILL (similar and compatible with the GNU GPL) and is now available under the Apache 2.0 license.

== History ==
The development started in January 2006 with the first release in July 2006. The development version is publicly accessible.

=== Release history ===
Version	Codename	Release date	Comments
1.0.0		June 30, 2006	
1.2.0		February, 2007	
1.4.0		June, 2007	
1.6.0		October, 2007	
2.0.0		December, 2007	
2.2.0		June, 2008	
2.4.0		July, 2008	
2.6.0	Halloween	November, 2008	
2.8.0	恭喜发财 (Gong Xi Fa Cai)	January, 2009	
3.0.0	Manhã de Carnaval	May, 2009	
3.2.0	62°38'35" S 60°14'31" W	January, 2010	
3.4.0	Perl A Rebours	July, 2010	
3.6.0	California Dreamin'	October 7, 2010	
3.8.0	Pack Ice	December 17, 2010	
3.10.0	Feliç anniversari	June 30, 2011	
3.12.0	Πλειάδες	January 31, 2012	
3.16.0	“v(n+1) = sqrt((v(n)-3)*100)”	February 4, 2013	
3.18.0	“Seven years of Coding”	July 3, 2013	
3.18.1		July 23, 2013	
3.20.0		November, 2013	
4.0.0		March, 2014	
4.2.0		September 3, 2014	
4.2.1		September 19, 2014	
4.4.0		February, 2015	
5.0.0		May, 2015	
5.2.0		December, 2015	
5.2.1		January, 2016	
5.4.0		May, 2016	
5.6.0		July, 2016	
5.6.1		August, 2016	
5.8.0		November, 2016	
5.10.0		February, 2017	
5.10.1		March, 2017	
6.0.0		May, 2017	
6.2.0		October, 2017	
6.4.0		January, 2018	
6.6.0		June, 2018	
6.6.1		December, 2018	
6.6.2		April, 2019	
7.0.0		October, 2019	Start using Semantic Versioning
7.1.0		March, 2020	
7.2.0		October, 2020	
7.3.0		May, 2021	
7.4.0		September, 2021	
7.4.1		April, 2022	
8.0.0		March, 2022	
8.0.1		April, 2021	
8.1.0		September, 2022	
8.1.1		January, 2023	
8.1.2		July, 2023	
9.0.0		February, 2024	Dropping Monteverdi, Mapla and Mac support. Big changes in compilation chain
9.1.0		September, 2024	Spot5 support
9.1.1	911_license_change_emergency	March, 2025	No more FFTW shipped by default with OTB (it leads to GPLv2 contamination)

=== Presentations ===
OTB has been presented in major conferences across the five continents

- IGARSS 2008 in Boston
- ISPRS 2008 in Beijing
- International Summer School on VHR Remote Sensing 2008 in Grenoble
- ESA-EUSC 2008 in Frascati
- EUSC Software days 2009 in Madrid
- AUF 2009 in Alger
- IGARSS 2009 in Cape Town for the invited session Open Source Initiatives for Remote Sensing - Orfeo Toolbox
- FOSS4G 2009 in Sydney
- Capacity building 2009 in Antananarivo
- Insight Toolkit 2010 Workshop in Washington as a keynote session
- IGARSS 2010 in Honolulu for a tutorial
- FOSS4G 2010 in Barcelona
- OGRS 2012 in Yverdon Les Bains

According to statistics on Open Hub, there is a total of 95 contributors and almost 402,000 lines of code (this include many libraries upon which OTB is built).

OTB in also use for the development of the operational ground segment for the VENμS (Vegetation and Environment monitoring on a New Micro Satellite) and the ESA Sentinel-2 missions.
