= Stapl =

C++ library providing parallelism support

STAPL
- Developer: Texas A&M University Parasol Lab
- Written in: C++
- Type: library or framework
- Website: parasollab.web.illinois.edu/research/stapl/
- Repository: gitlab.com/parasol-lab/stapl

STAPL (Standard Template Adaptive Parallel Library) is a library for C++, similar and compatible to STL. It provides parallelism support for writing applications for systems with shared or distributed memory.

It was developed by Lawrence Rauchwerger, Nancy M. Amato, Bjarne Stroustrup and several grad students at Texas A&M University.

== Components ==
- Components for Program Development
  - pContainers - generic, distributed data structures with parallel methods.
  - Views - equivalent of STL iterators, extended to allow efficient parallelism.
  - pRange - a parallel task dependence graph recursively defined as a tree of subranges.
  - pAlgorithms - parallel equivalents of STL algorithms.
- Run-time System(RTS) providing the following facilities:
  - Adaptive Remote Method Invocation (ARMI)
  - Framework for Algorithm Selection and Tuning(FAST)

== See also ==
- Parallel computing
- List of C++ template libraries
- Threading Building Blocks (TBB)
