= Adaptive Communication Environment =

Open-source network programming framework

ADAPTIVE Communication Environment (ACE)
- Initial release: 1993; 33 years ago
- Stable release: 7.0.11 / December 19, 2022; 3 years ago
- Written in: C++
- Type: Object-oriented C++ classes Framework for Network
- Website: www.dre.vanderbilt.edu/~schmidt/ACE.html

The Adaptive Communication Environment (ACE) is an open source software framework used for network programming. It provides a set of object-oriented C++ classes designed to help address the inherent complexities and challenges in network programming by preventing common errors.

== History ==
ACE was initially developed by Douglas C. Schmidt during his graduate work at the University of California, Irvine. Development followed him to the Washington University in St. Louis, where he was employed. ACE is open-source software released by WU's Distributed Object Computer (DOC) group. Its development continued in the Institute for Software Integrated Systems (ISIS) at Vanderbilt University.

== Features ==
ACE provides a standardized usage for operating system/machine specific features. It provides common data types and methods to access the powerful but complex features of modern operating systems. These include: inter-process communication, thread management, efficient memory management, etc.

It was designed to be portable and provide a common framework. The same code will work on most Unixes, Windows, VxWorks, QNX, OpenVMS, etc., with minimal changes. Due to this cross-platform support, it has been widely used in the development of communication software. Some of the successful projects that have used ACE includes: Motorola Iridium satellites, Boeing Wedgetail's Australian airborne early warning & control (AEW&C) system, and others.

ACE used software design patterns.

== See also ==
- Communication software
- Component-integrated ACE ORB
- Cross-platform support middleware
- TAO (software)
