= List of arbitrary-precision arithmetic software =

This article lists libraries, applications, and other software which enable or support arbitrary-precision arithmetic.

== Libraries ==
Package-library name	Number type	Language	License
Boost Multiprecision Library	Integers, rationals, floats, and complex	C++ and backends using GMP/MPFR	Boost
TTMath	Integers, floats	C++	BSD
LibBF	Integers, floats	C	MIT
BeeNum	Integers, rationals	C++	MIT
longer-int	Integers	C	GPL
GNU Multi-Precision Library (and MPFR)	Integers, rationals, and floats	C and C++ with bindings	LGPL
CLN	Integers, rationals, floats, and complex	C++	GPL
ARPREC	Integers, floats, and complex	C++	BSD-type
MAPM, MAPM	Integers, decimal and complex floats	C (bindings for C++)	Freeware
MPIR (mathematics software)	Integers, rationals, and floats	C and C++ with bindings	LGPL
CORE	Integers, rationals, and floats	C++	Freeware
LEDA	Integers, rationals, and floats	C++	Proprietary
CGAL	Integers, rationals, and floats	C++	LGPL
GeometricTools	Integers and rationals	C++	Boost
LibTomMath	Integers	C	Public Domain or WTFPL (dual-licensed)
libgcrypt	Integers	C	LGPL
OpenSSL	Integers	C	Apache License 2.0
Arbitraire	Floats	C	MIT License
mbed TLS	Integers	C	Apache License 2.0 and GPL
JScience	Integers, rationals, and floats	Java	BSD-type
JAS	Integers, rationals, and complex numbers	Java	LGPL
Big-Math	Integers, rationals, and complex numbers	Java	MIT
JLinAlg	Decimals, rationals, and complex numbers	Java	LGPL
Apfloat	Integers, rationals, floats, and complex numbers	Java, C++	MIT License
MPArith	Integers, rationals, floats, and complex numbers	Pascal, Delphi	Zlib
InfInt	Integers	C++	MPL
bigz	Integers, rationals	C (bindings for C++)	BSD-type
C++ BigInt Class	Integers	C++	GPL
num	Integers, rationals, and complex	Rust	Apache License 2.0
num7	Decimals	C++	MIT
float	Floats	Rust	Apache License 2.0
astro-float	Floats	Rust	MIT
fgmp	Integers	C	Public Domain
imath	Integers, rationals	ANSI C	MIT
hebimath	Integers, rationals, naturals, floats	C (C99)	MIT
bsdnt	Integers, naturals	C	BSD (2-clause)
integer-simple	Integers	Haskell	BSD (3-clause)
bigints	Integers	Nim	MIT
libzahl (WIP)	Integers	C	ISC
decimal	Decimals	Go	BSD (3-clause)
mpmath	Floats and complex	Python	BSD
Computable Reals	Computable Reals	Common Lisp	BSD (3-clause)
libmpdec and libmpdec++	Decimal floats	C and C++	BSD (2-clause)
GEM Library	Floats and complex numbers	MATLAB and GNU Octave	MPL
Bignums library	Integers, rationals, floats, and complex	Snap!	Unknown
Hyper	Integers, reals, floats	For .NET Framework, written in VB.NET and ML64 assembler	Non-commercial use
Simple long integer math library for C++	Integers	C++	MIT

== Stand-alone application software ==
Software that supports arbitrary precision computations:

- bc the POSIX arbitrary-precision arithmetic language that comes standard on most Unix-like systems.
  - dc: "Desktop Calculator" arbitrary-precision RPN calculator that comes standard on most Unix-like systems.
- KCalc, Linux based scientific calculator
- Maxima: a computer algebra system which bignum integers are directly inherited from its implementation language Common Lisp. In addition, it supports arbitrary-precision floating-point numbers, bigfloats.
- Maple, Mathematica, and several other computer algebra software include arbitrary-precision arithmetic. Mathematica employs GMP for approximate number computation.
- PARI/GP, an open source computer algebra system that supports arbitrary precision.
- Qalculate!, an open-source free software arbitrary precision calculator with autocomplete.
- SageMath, an open-source computer algebra system
- SymPy, a CAS
- Symbolic Math toolbox (MATLAB)
- Windows Calculator, since Windows 98, uses arbitrary precision for basic operations (addition, subtraction, multiplication, division) and 32 digits of precision for advanced operations (square root, transcendental functions).
- SmartXML, a free programming language with integrated development environment (IDE) for mathematical calculations. Variables of BigNumber type can be used, or regular numbers can be converted to big numbers using conversion operator # (e.g., #2.3^2000.1). SmartXML big numbers can have up to 100,000,000 decimal digits and up to 100,000,000 whole digits.

== Languages ==
Programming languages that support arbitrary precision computations, either built-in, or in the standard library of the language:

- Ada: the upcoming Ada 202x revision adds the Ada.Numerics.Big_Numbers.Big_Integers and Ada.Numerics.Big_Numbers.Big_Reals packages to the standard library, providing arbitrary precision integers and real numbers.
- Agda: the BigInt datatype on Epic backend implements arbitrary-precision arithmetic.
- Common Lisp: The ANSI Common Lisp standard supports arbitrary precision integer, ratio, and complex numbers.
- C#: System.Numerics.BigInteger, from .NET 5
- ColdFusion: the built-in PrecisionEvaluate() function evaluates one or more string expressions, dynamically, from left to right, using BigDecimal precision arithmetic to calculate the values of arbitrary precision arithmetic expressions.
- D: standard library module std.bigint
- Dart: the built-in int datatype implements arbitrary-precision arithmetic.
- Emacs Lisp: supports integers of arbitrary size, starting with Emacs 27.1.
- Erlang: the built-in Integer datatype implements arbitrary-precision arithmetic.
- Go: the standard library package math/big implements arbitrary-precision integers (Int type), rational numbers (Rat type), and floating-point numbers (Float type)
- Guile: the built-in exact numbers are of arbitrary precision. Example: (expt 10 100) produces the expected (large) result. Exact numbers also include rationals, so (/ 3 4) produces 3/4. One of the languages implemented in Guile is Scheme.
- Haskell: the built-in Integer datatype implements arbitrary-precision arithmetic and the standard Data.Ratio module implements rational numbers.
- Idris: the built-in Integer datatype implements arbitrary-precision arithmetic.
- ISLISP: The ISO/IEC 13816:1997(E) ISLISP standard supports arbitrary precision integer numbers.
- J: built-in extended precision
- Java: Class java.math.BigInteger (integer), java.math.BigDecimal Class (decimal)
- JavaScript: as of ES2020, BigInt is supported in most browsers; the gwt-math library provides an interface to java.math.BigDecimal, and libraries such as DecimalJS, BigInt and Crunch support arbitrary-precision integers.
- Julia: the built-in BigFloat and BigInt types provide arbitrary-precision floating point and integer arithmetic respectively.
- newRPL: integers and floats can be of arbitrary precision (up to at least 2000 digits); maximum number of digits configurable (default 32 digits)
- Nim: bigints and multiple GMP bindings.
- OCaml: The Num library supports arbitrary-precision integers and rationals.
- OpenLisp: supports arbitrary precision integer numbers.
- Perl: The bignum and bigrat pragmas provide BigNum and BigRational support for Perl.
- PHP: The BC Math module provides arbitrary precision mathematics.
- PicoLisp: supports arbitrary precision integers.
- Pike: the built-in int type will silently change from machine-native integer to arbitrary precision as soon as the value exceeds the former's capacity.
- Prolog: ISO standard compatible Prolog systems can check the Prolog flag "bounded". Most of the major Prolog systems support arbitrary precision integer numbers.
- Python: the built-in int (3.x) / long (2.x) integer type is of arbitrary precision. The Decimal class in the standard library module decimal has user definable precision and limited mathematical operations (exponentiation, square root, etc. but no trigonometric functions). The Fraction class in the module fractions implements rational numbers. More extensive arbitrary precision floating point arithmetic is available with the third-party "mpmath" and "bigfloat" packages.
- Racket: the built-in exact numbers are of arbitrary precision. Example: (expt 10 100) produces the expected (large) result. Exact numbers also include rationals, so (/ 3 4) produces 3/4. Arbitrary precision floating point numbers are included in the standard library math/bigfloat module.
- Raku: Rakudo supports Int and FatRat data types that promote to arbitrary-precision integers and rationals.
- Rexx: variants including Open Object Rexx and NetRexx
- RPL (only on HP 49/50 series in exact mode): calculator treats numbers entered without decimal point as integers rather than floats; integers are of arbitrary precision only limited by the available memory.
- Ruby: the built-in Bignum integer type is of arbitrary precision. The BigDecimal class in the standard library module bigdecimal has user definable precision.
- Scheme: R^{5}RS encourages, and R^{6}RS requires, that exact integers and exact rationals be of arbitrary precision.
- Scala: Class BigInt and Class BigDecimal.
- Seed7: bigInteger and bigRational.
- Self: arbitrary precision integers are supported by the built-in bigInt type.
- Smalltalk: variants including Squeak, Smalltalk/X, GNU Smalltalk, Dolphin Smalltalk, etc.
- SmartXML, a free programming language with integrated development environment (IDE) for mathematical calculations. Variables of BigNumber type can be used, or regular numbers can be converted to big numbers using conversion operator # (e.g., #2.3^2000.1). SmartXML big numbers can have up to 100,000,000 decimal digits and up to 100,000,000 whole digits.
- Standard ML: The optional built-in IntInf structure implements the INTEGER signature and supports arbitrary-precision integers.
- Tcl: As of version 8.5 (2007), integers are arbitrary-precision by default. (Behind the scenes, the language switches to using an arbitrary-precision internal representation for integers too large to fit in a machine word. Bindings from C should use library functions such as Tcl_GetLongFromObj to get values as C-native data types from Tcl integers.)
- Wolfram Language, like Mathematica, employs GMP for approximate number computation.

== Online calculators ==
For one-off calculations. Runs on server or in browser. No installation or compilation required.

- 1. https://www.mathsisfun.com/calculator-precision.html 200 places
- 2. http://birrell.org/andrew/ratcalc/ arbitrary; select rational or fixed-point and number of places
- 3. PARI/GP online calculator - https://pari.math.u-bordeaux.fr/gp.html (PARI/GP is a widely used computer algebra system designed for fast computations in number theory (factorizations, algebraic number theory, elliptic curves, modular forms, L functions...), but also contains a large number of other useful functions to compute with mathematical entities such as matrices, polynomials, power series, algebraic numbers etc., and a lot of transcendental functions. PARI is also available as a C library to allow for faster computations.)
- 4.1. AutoCalcs - allow users to Search, Create, Store and Share multi-step calculations using explicit expressions featuring automated Unit Conversion. It is a platform that allows users to go beyond unit conversion, which in turn brings in significantly improved efficiency. A lot of sample calculations can be found at AutoCalcs Docs site. Calculations created with AutoCalcs can be embedded into 3rd party websites.
- 4.2. AutoCalcs Docs - considering above mentioned
- 5.AutoCalcs as the calculation engine, this Docs site is a library with a host of calculations, where each calculation is essentially a web app that can run online, be further customized, and much more. Imaging reading a book with a lot of calculations, then this is the book/manual with all calculations that can be used on the fly. It is worthwhile to mention - when units are involved in the calculations, the unit conversion can be automated.
- 6. Big Number Calculator: an arbitrary precision integer and decimal calculator, with support for decimal shifting and data type fitting.
- 7. Desmos Calculator – a free, browser-based graphing and scientific calculator with real-time plotting, sliders, and expression evaluation. No installation or account required for basic use; widely used in education and for quick visual checks of functions and data.
- 8. Wolfram|Alpha – a computational knowledge engine that evaluates mathematical expressions, solves equations, and performs symbolic and numeric calculations. Free tier supports one-off queries; Pro subscription adds step-by-step solutions and extended computation time.
- 9. Calculator.net – a large collection of free online calculators for finance, health, math, date/time, and everyday utilities. Runs entirely in the browser with no sign-up; each tool is a self-contained web app for quick, single-purpose calculations.
- 10. Omni Calculator – a family of topic-focused calculators (e.g., loan, BMI, calorie, physics, statistics) with explanatory text and example inputs. Free, no registration, and designed for non-specialists who need reliable, ready-to-use formulas.
- 11. RapidTables Calculators – a set of lightweight calculators for math, electronics, finance, and unit conversion. Pages are minimal and fast-loading, suitable for quick reference without distractions.
- 12. Inch Calculator – a broad directory of construction, DIY, finance, and health calculators, with built-in unit conversion and practical examples. Free to use in-browser; no installation or account needed.
- 13. Mathway Calculator – an online problem-solving interface that handles algebra, calculus, and statistics expressions with step hints. Basic calculations are free; full step-by-step access requires a subscription.
- 14. anycal.inforcore.net – a free, lightweight collection of simple, everyday calculators that run directly in the browser. No installation or sign-up is required; the site is designed to be swifty, handy, and light, offering a variety of small tools for practical, real-life calculations.
- 15. Symbolab Solver – an online calculator and equation solver covering algebra, trigonometry, calculus, and linear algebra. Provides step-by-step solutions with a freemium model; basic solving is available without payment.
