= MPIR (mathematics software) =

Multiprecision integer software library

MPIR: Multiple Precision Integers and Rationals
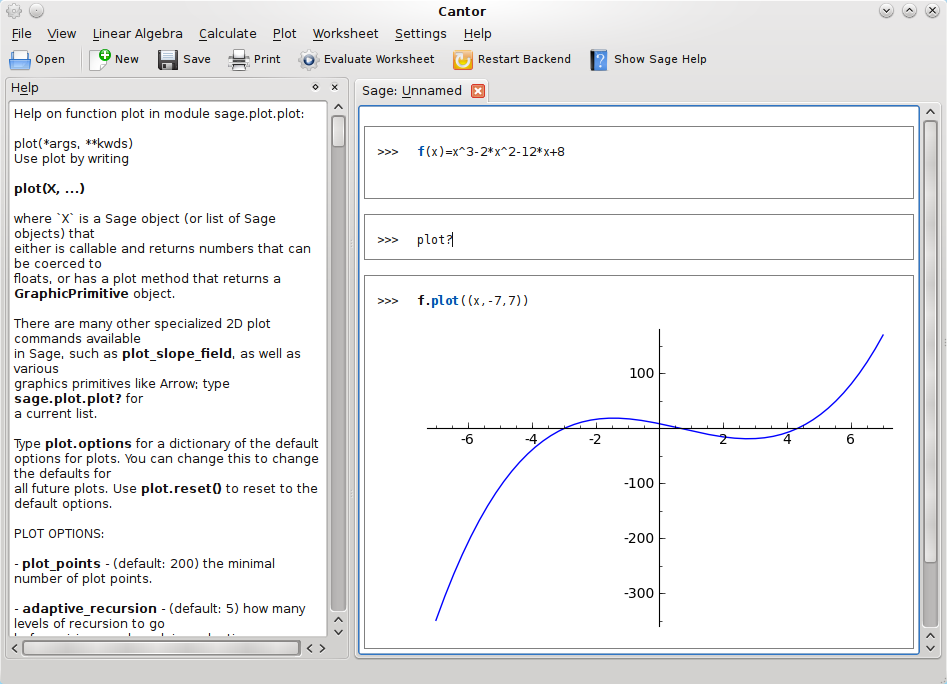
- SageMath, a computer algebra system that formerly used MPIR
- Developers: William Hart and the MPIR Team
- Stable release: 3.0.0 / March 1, 2017; 9 years ago
- Written in: C, C++, assembly
- Operating system: Cross-platform
- Type: Mathematical software
- License: LGPL
- Website: https://web.archive.org/web/20220204054313/http://www.mpir.org/

Multiple Precision Integers and Rationals (MPIR) is an open-source software multiprecision integer library forked from the GNU Multiple Precision Arithmetic Library (GMP) project. It consists of much code from past GMP releases, and some original contributed code.

According to the MPIR-devel mailing list, "MPIR is no longer maintained", except for building the old code on Windows using new versions of Microsoft Visual Studio.

According to the MPIR developers, some of the main goals of the MPIR project were:

- Maintaining compatibility with GMP – so that MPIR can be used as a replacement for GMP.
- Providing build support for Linux, Mac OS, Solaris and Windows systems.
- Supporting building MPIR using Microsoft based build tools for use in 32- and 64-bit versions of Windows.

MPIR is optimized for many processors (CPUs). Assembly language code exists for these as of 2012: ARM, DEC Alpha 21064, 21164, and 21264, AMD K6, K6-2, Athlon, K8 and K10, Intel Pentium, Pentium Pro-II-III, Pentium 4, generic x86, Intel IA-64, Core 2, i7, Atom, Motorola-IBM PowerPC 32 and 64, MIPS R3000, R4000, SPARCv7, SuperSPARC, generic SPARCv8, UltraSPARC.

== Language bindings ==
| Library name | Language | License |
|---|---|---|
| | C, C++ | LGPL |
| Mpir.NET | F#, C#, .NET | LGPL |

== See also ==
- Arbitrary-precision arithmetic, data type: bignum
- GNU Multiple Precision Arithmetic Library
- GNU Multiple Precision Floating-Point Reliably (MPFR)
- Class Library for Numbers supporting GiNaC
- List of open-source mathematical libraries
