= Big numbers =

Big numbers may refer to:

- Large numbers, numbers that are significantly larger than those ordinarily used in everyday life
- Arbitrary-precision arithmetic, also called bignum arithmetic
- Big Numbers (comics), an unfinished comics series by Alan Moore and Bill Sienkiewicz

== See also ==
- Names of large numbers
- List of arbitrary-precision arithmetic software
