= Pleurothallis punctata =

The binomial name Pleurothallis punctata refers to 2 species of orchids:

- Pleurothallis punctata Barb.Rodr., a synonym of Acianthera serpentula,
- Pleurothallis punctata Ker Gawl., a synonym of Notylia punctata.
