= Decimal data type =

Data type for storing floating-point numbers in base-10

Some programming languages (or compilers for them) provide a built-in (primitive) or library decimal data type to represent non-repeating decimal fractions like 0.3 and −1.17 without rounding, and to do arithmetic on them. Examples are the decimal.Decimal or num7.Num type of Python, and analogous types provided by other languages.

== Rationale ==
Fractional numbers are supported on most programming languages as floating-point numbers or fixed-point numbers. However, such representations typically restrict the denominator to a power of two. Most decimal fractions (or most fractions in general) cannot be represented exactly as a fraction with a denominator that is a power of two. For example, the simple decimal fraction 0.3 (3/10) might be represented as 5404319552844595/18014398509481984 (0.299999999999999988897769…). This inexactness causes many problems that are familiar to experienced programmers. For example, the expression 0.1 * 7 == 0.7 might counterintuitively evaluate to false in some systems, due to the inexactness of the representation of decimals.

Although all decimal fractions are fractions, and thus it is possible to use a rational data type to represent it exactly, it may be more convenient in many situations to consider only non-repeating decimal fractions (fractions whose denominator is a power of ten). For example, fractional units of currency worldwide are mostly based on a denominator that is a power of ten. Also, most fractional measurements in science are reported as decimal fractions, as opposed to fractions with any other system of denominators.

A decimal data type could be implemented as either a floating-point number or as a fixed-point number. In the fixed-point case, the denominator would be set to a fixed power of ten. In the floating-point case, a variable exponent would represent the power of ten to which the mantissa of the number is multiplied.

Languages that support a rational data type usually allow the construction of such a value from two integers, instead of a base-2 floating-point number, due to the loss of exactness the latter would cause. Usually the basic arithmetic operations (+, −, ×, ÷, integer powers) and comparisons (=, <, >, ≤, ≥, ≠) would be extended to act on them—either natively or through operator overloading facilities provided by the language. These operations may be translated by the compiler into a sequence of integer machine instructions, or into library calls. Support may also extend to other operations, such as formatting, rounding to an integer or floating point value, etc.

== Standard formats ==
IEEE 754 specifies three standard floating-point decimal data types of different precision, introduced in the 2008 revision of the standard (also adopted as ISO/IEC/IEEE 60559:2011):

- Decimal32 floating-point format
- Decimal64 floating-point format
- Decimal128 floating-point format

== Language support ==
- C# has a built-in data type decimal consisting of 128 bits resulting in 28–29 significant digits. It has an approximate range of ±1.0 × 10^{−28} to ±7.9228 × 10^{28}.
- Starting with Python 2.4, Python's standard library includes a Decimal class in the module decimal.
- Ruby's standard library includes a BigDecimal class in the module bigdecimal.
- Java's standard library includes a java.math.BigDecimal class.
- In Objective-C, the Cocoa and GNUstep APIs provide an NSDecimalNumber class and an NSDecimal C data type for representing decimals whose mantissa is up to 38 digits long, and exponent is from −128 to 127.
- Some IBM systems and SQL systems support DECFLOAT format with at least the two larger formats.
- ABAP's new DECFLOAT data type includes decimal64 (as DECFLOAT16) and decimal128 (as DECFLOAT34) formats.
- PL/I natively supports both fixed-point and floating-point decimal data.
- GNU Compiler Collection (gcc) provides support for decimal floats as an extension to C and C++.

== See also ==
- Arbitrary-precision arithmetic
- Floating-point arithmetic
- Floating-point error mitigation
