= SageMath =

Computer algebra system

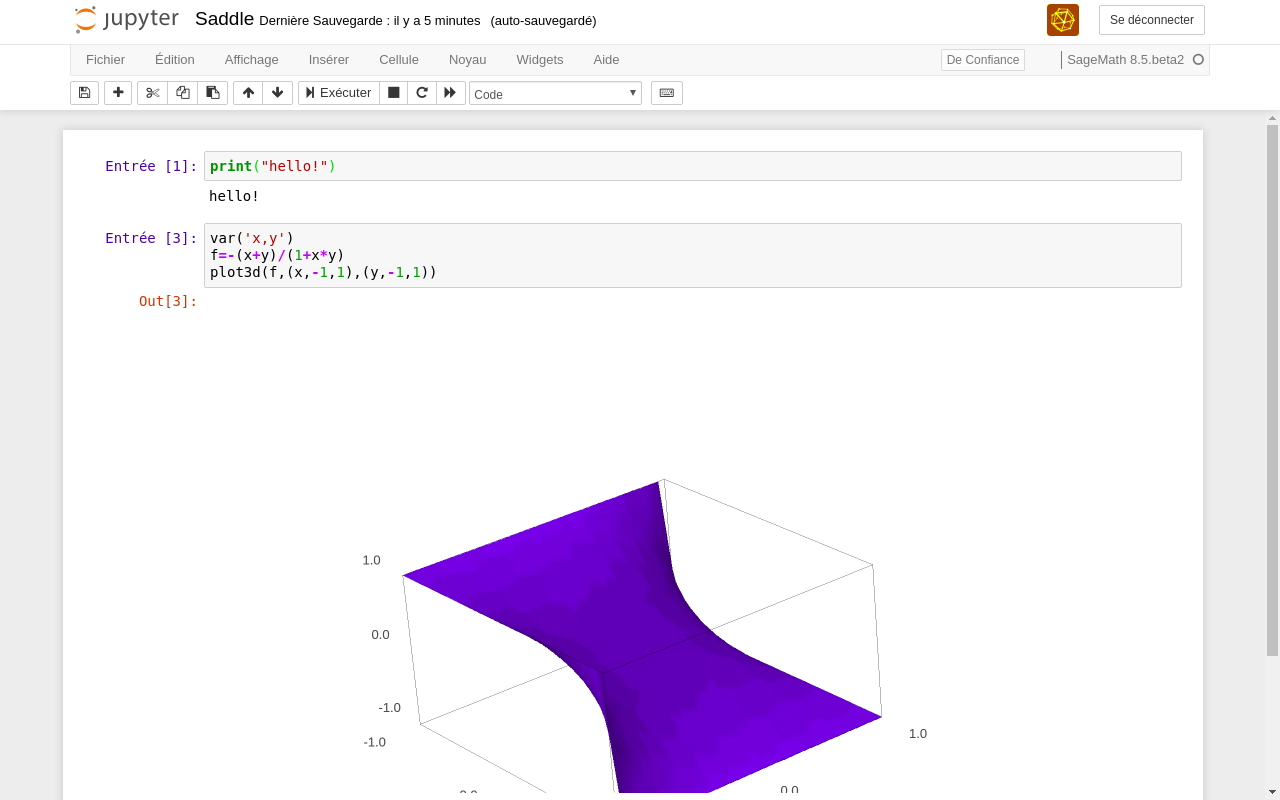
- Sagemath document (Jupyter Notebook) inside a web browser
- Initial release: 24 February 2005; 21 years ago
- Stable release: 10.8 (18 December 2025; 4 months ago)
- Preview release: 10.8.beta9 / 11 November 2025; 5 months ago
- Written in: Python, Cython
- Operating system: Linux, macOS, Microsoft Windows, Solaris, Android, iOS
- Platform: Personal computers and web platform; IA-32, x86-64, ARM, SPARC (and before Itanium)
- Size: Approx. 112–3319 MB
- Type: Computer algebra system
- License: GPLv3
- Website: www.sagemath.org
- Repository: github.com/sagemath/sage

SageMath (previously Sage or SAGE, "System for Algebra and Geometry Experimentation") is a computer algebra system (CAS) with features covering many aspects of mathematics, including algebra, combinatorics, graph theory, group theory, differentiable manifolds, numerical analysis, number theory, calculus, and statistics.

The first version of SageMath was released on 24 February 2005 as free and open-source software under the terms of the GNU General Public License version 2, with the initial goals of creating an "open source alternative to Magma, Maple, Mathematica, and MATLAB". The originator and leader of the SageMath project, William Stein, was a mathematician at the University of Washington.

SageMath uses a syntax resembling Python's, supporting procedural, functional, and object-oriented constructs.

== Development ==
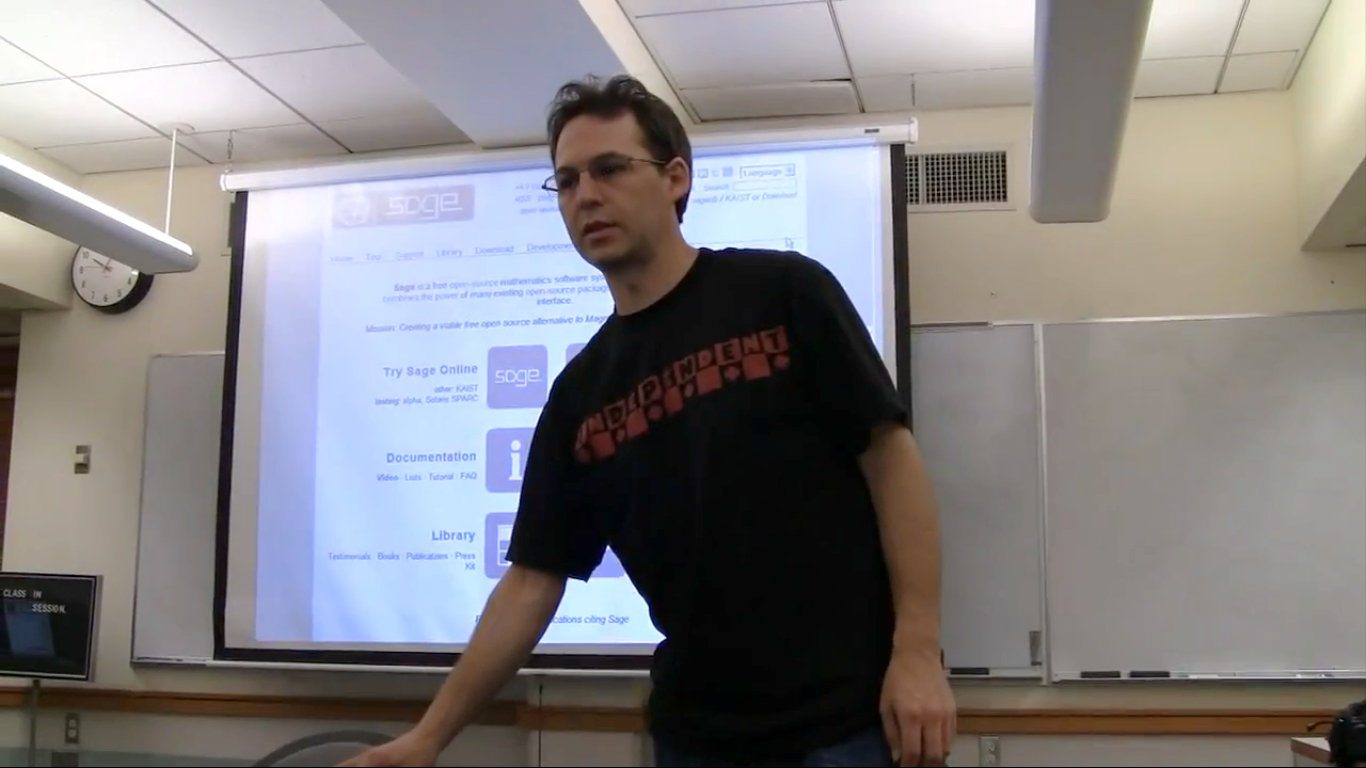
William A. Stein, originator and leader of the SageMath project

Stein realized when designing Sage that there were many open-source mathematics software packages already written in different languages, namely C, C++, Common Lisp, Fortran and Python.

Rather than reinventing the wheel, Sage (which is written mostly in Python and Cython) integrates many specialized CAS software packages into a common interface, for which a user needs to know only Python. However, Sage contains hundreds of thousands of unique lines of code adding new functions and creating the interfaces among its components.

SageMath uses both students and professionals for development. The development of SageMath is supported by both volunteer work and grants. However, it was not until 2016 that the first full-time Sage developer was hired (funded by an EU grant). The same year, Stein described his disappointment with a lack of academic funding and credentials for software development, citing it as the reason for his decision to leave his tenured academic position to work full-time on the project in a newly founded company, SageMath Inc.

== Achievements ==
- 2007: first prize in the scientific software division of Les Trophées du Libre, an international competition for free software.
- 2012: one of the projects selected for the Google Summer of Code.
- 2013: ACM/SIGSAM Jenks Prize.

== Licensing and availability ==
SageMath is free software, distributed under the terms of the GNU General Public License version 3.

Windows

SageMath 10.0 (May 2023) requires Windows Subsystem for Linux in version 2, which in turn requires Windows to run as a Hyper-V client. SageMath 8.0 (July 2017), with development funded by the OpenDreamKit project, successfully built on Cygwin, and a binary installer for 64-bit versions of Windows was available. Although Microsoft was sponsoring a Windows version of SageMath, prior to 2016 users of Windows had to use virtualization technology such as VirtualBox to run SageMath.

Linux

SageMath is available as a package in some Linux distributions, including Arch Linux, Debian, Guix, Ubuntu and NixOS. In Gentoo, it is available via layman in the "sage-on-gentoo" overlay. The packages used by NixOS and Gnu Guix are available for use on other distributions, due to the distribution-agnostic nature of their package managers.

Other operating systems

Gentoo prefix also provides Sage on other operating systems.

== Software packages contained in SageMath ==
The philosophy of SageMath is to use existing open-source libraries wherever they exist. Therefore, it uses many libraries from other projects.

Mathematics packages contained in SageMath	Algebra	GAP, Singular, FLINT
Mathematics packages contained in SageMath	Algebraic geometry	Singular
Mathematics packages contained in SageMath	Arbitrary-precision arithmetic	GMP, MPFR, MPFI, NTL, mpmath, Arb
Mathematics packages contained in SageMath	Arithmetic geometry	PARI/GP, NTL, mwrank, ECM
Mathematics packages contained in SageMath	Calculus	Maxima, SymPy, GiNaC, Giac, FriCAS
Mathematics packages contained in SageMath	Combinatorics	Symmetrica, Sage-Combinat
Mathematics packages contained in SageMath	Linear algebra	ATLAS, BLAS, LAPACK, NumPy, LinBox, IML, GSL
Mathematics packages contained in SageMath	Graph theory	NetworkX
Mathematics packages contained in SageMath	Group theory	GAP
Mathematics packages contained in SageMath	Numerical computation	GSL, SciPy, NumPy, ATLAS
Mathematics packages contained in SageMath	Number theory	PARI/GP, FLINT, NTL
Mathematics packages contained in SageMath	Statistical computing	R, SciPy
Other packages contained in SageMath	Command-line shell	IPython
Other packages contained in SageMath	Database	ZODB, SQLite
Other packages contained in SageMath	Graphical interface	SageMath Notebook, MathJax (formerly jsMath)
Other packages contained in SageMath	Graphics	Matplotlib, Tachyon, GD, Jmol
Other packages contained in SageMath	Interactive programming language	Python
Other packages contained in SageMath	Networking	Twisted
Other Mathematics package available for SageMath	Differential geometry and tensor calculus	Sage Manifolds

== See also ==
- CoCalc
- Comparison of statistical packages
- List of computer algebra systems
