= NTL =

NTL may refer to:

== Companies ==
- NTL Incorporated and NTL Internet, later Virgin Media, communications media company
  - NTL Ireland, later Virgin Media Ireland
- Arqiva, UK company formerly NTL Broadcast and National Transcommunications Limited
- Northern Trains, with the legal name Northern Trains Limited, a train operating company across the north of England

== Academia ==
- National Training Laboratories, Alexandria, Virginia, US, psychology center
- National Transportation Library, US

== Code ==
- Netley railway station, Eastleigh, England, National Rail station code
- Newcastle Airport (New South Wales), Australia, IATA code
- Notylia, a genus of orchids

== Sport ==
- Former National Tennis League
- National Touch League, a touch rugby competition, Australia

== Other ==
- Nevertheless (band), a Christian rock band
- Number Theory Library, a computer library
- Normal Tidal Limit in a river affected by tides
- Ntl (trigraph), used in the Xhosa language to write the sound /ntɬʼ/
- Norsk Tjenestemannslag, a Norwegian trade union
