= Q notation =

Q notation may refer to:

- Q notation (scientific notation), a notation for the representation of quadruple-precision numbers in exponential notation
- Q notation (number format), a notation to specify the format of fixed point numbers
