= Libfixmath =

Platform-independent fixed-point math library

libfixmath
- Developer: Ben Brewer
- Stable release: r64 / February 2, 2012; 14 years ago
- Written in: C99
- Operating system: Cross-platform
- Type: fixed-point math library
- License: MIT
- Website: code.google.com/p/libfixmath
- Repository: code.google.com/archive/p/libfixmath/source/default/source

libfixmath is a platform-independent fixed-point math library aimed at developers wanting to perform fast non-integer math on platforms lacking a (or with a low performance) FPU. It offers developers a similar interface to the standard math.h functions for use on Q16.16 fixed-point numbers. libfixmath has no external dependencies other than stdint.h and a compiler which supports 64-bit integer arithmetic (such as GCC). Conditional compilation options exist to remove the requirement for a 64-bit capable compiler as many compilers for microcontrollers and DSPs do not support 64-bit arithmetic.

== History ==
libfixmath was developed by Ben Brewer and first released publicly as part of the Dingoo SDK. It has since been used to implement a software 3D graphics library called FGL.

== Q16.16 functions ==
Name	Description
fix16_acos	inverse cosine
fix16_asin	inverse sine
fix16_atan	one-parameter inverse tangent
fix16_atan2	two-parameter inverse tangent
fix16_cos	cosine
fix16_exp	exponential function
fix16_sin	sine
fix16_sqrt	square root
fix16_tan	tangent
fix16_mul	multiplication
fix16_div	division
fix16_sadd	saturated addition
fix16_smul	saturated multiplication
fix16_sdiv	saturated division

== Other functions ==
Name	Description
fix16_to_dbl	Convert Q16.16 to a double
fix16_to_float	Convert Q16.16 to a float
fix16_to_int	Convert Q16.16 to an integer
fix16_from_dbl	Convert double to a Q16.16
fix16_from_float	Convert float to a Q16.16
fix16_from_int	Convert integer to a Q16.16

== Performance ==
For the most intensive function (atan2) benchmark results show the following results:

Name	Time Compared to Float
ARM Cortex-M0	26.3%
Marvell PXA270 (ARM) @ 312 MHz	58.45%
Intel T5500	120%
Intel Atom N280	141%

Note: These results were calculated using fixtest with caching optimizations turned off.

== Licensing ==
libfixmath is released under the MIT License, a permissive free software licence, and is free software.

== See also ==
- Binary scaling
- Fixed-point arithmetic
- Floating-point arithmetic
- List of open-source mathematical libraries
- Q (number format)
