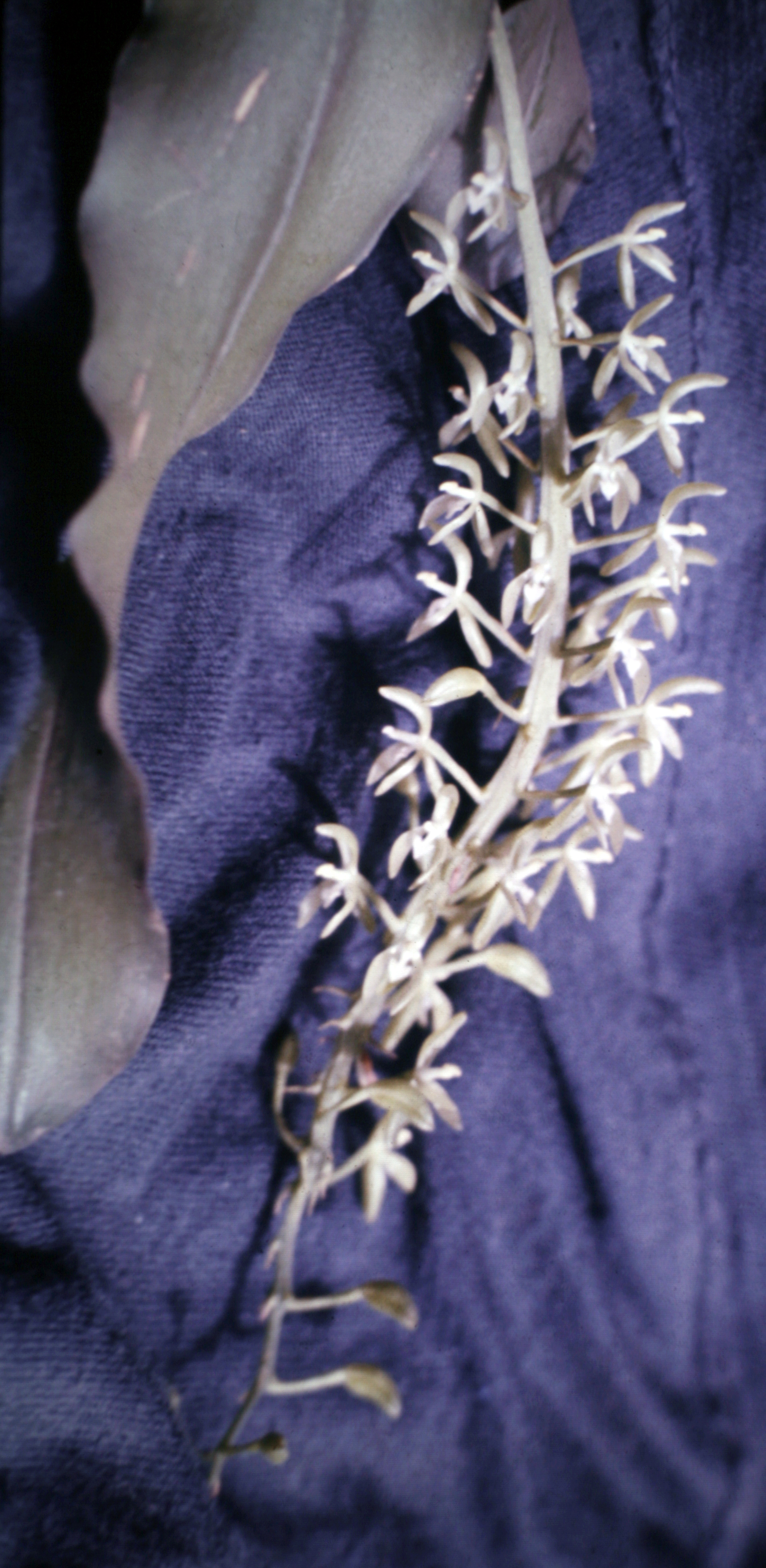

Scientific classification
- Kingdom: Plantae
- Clade: Tracheophytes
- Clade: Angiosperms
- Clade: Monocots
- Order: Asparagales
- Family: Orchidaceae
- Subfamily: Epidendroideae
- Genus: Notylia
- Species: N. sagittifera

Binomial name
- Notylia sagittifera Lindl.

Synonyms
- Pleurothallis sagittifera Kunth (basionym); Notylia multiflora Lindl.; Notylia tenuis Lindl.

= Notylia sagittifera =

Species of orchid

Notylia sagittifera is a species of orchid that occurs from Colombia, Venezuela, the Guianas and northeastern Brazil. It is a pseudobulbous epiphyte.
