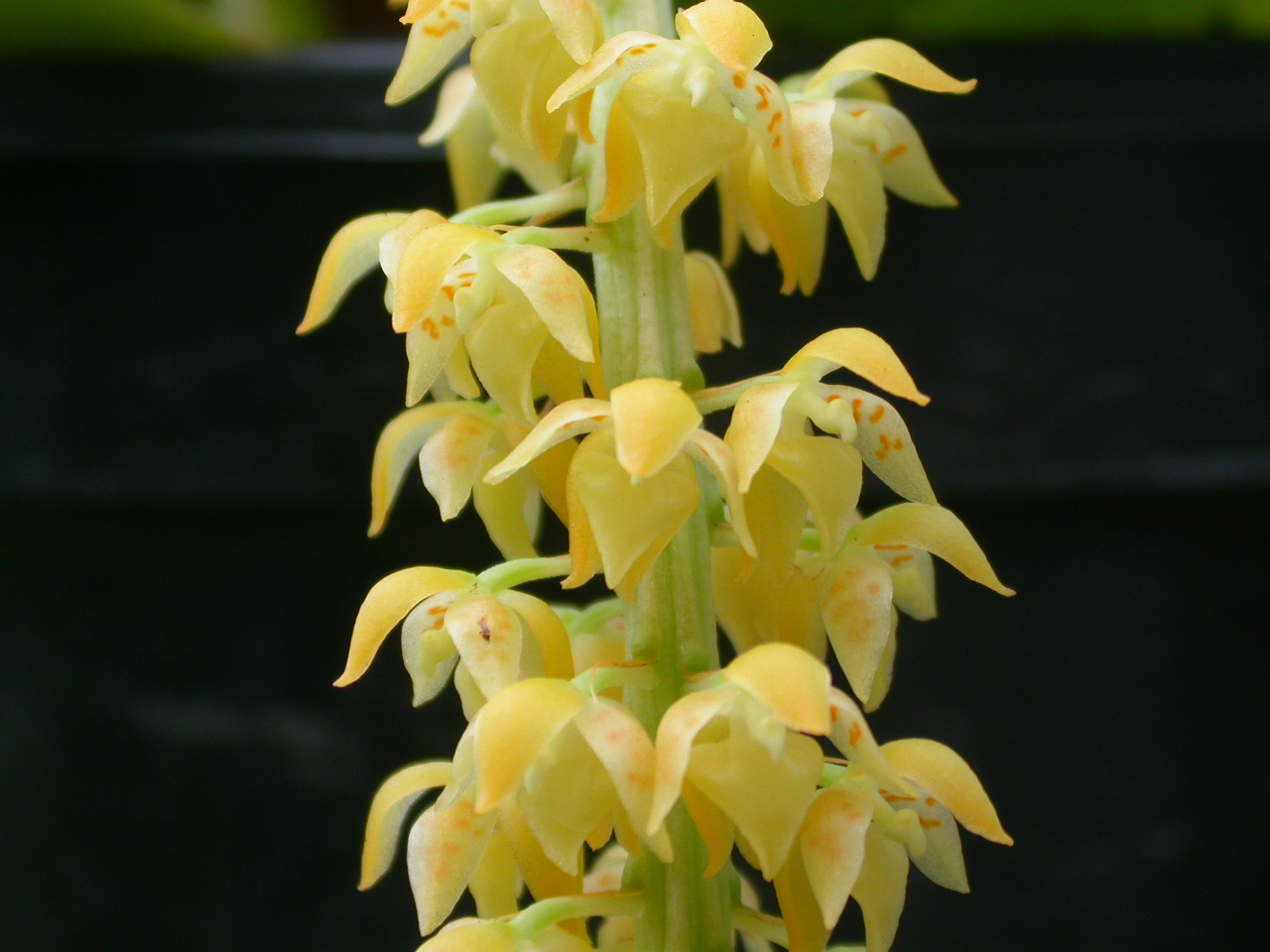

Scientific classification
- Kingdom: Plantae
- Clade: Tracheophytes
- Clade: Angiosperms
- Clade: Monocots
- Order: Asparagales
- Family: Orchidaceae
- Subfamily: Epidendroideae
- Genus: Notylia
- Species: N. bungerothii

Binomial name
- Notylia bungerothii Rchb.f.

= Notylia bungerothii =

Species of orchid

Notylia bungerothii is a species of orchid that occurs from Venezuela, Guyana and Ecuador.
