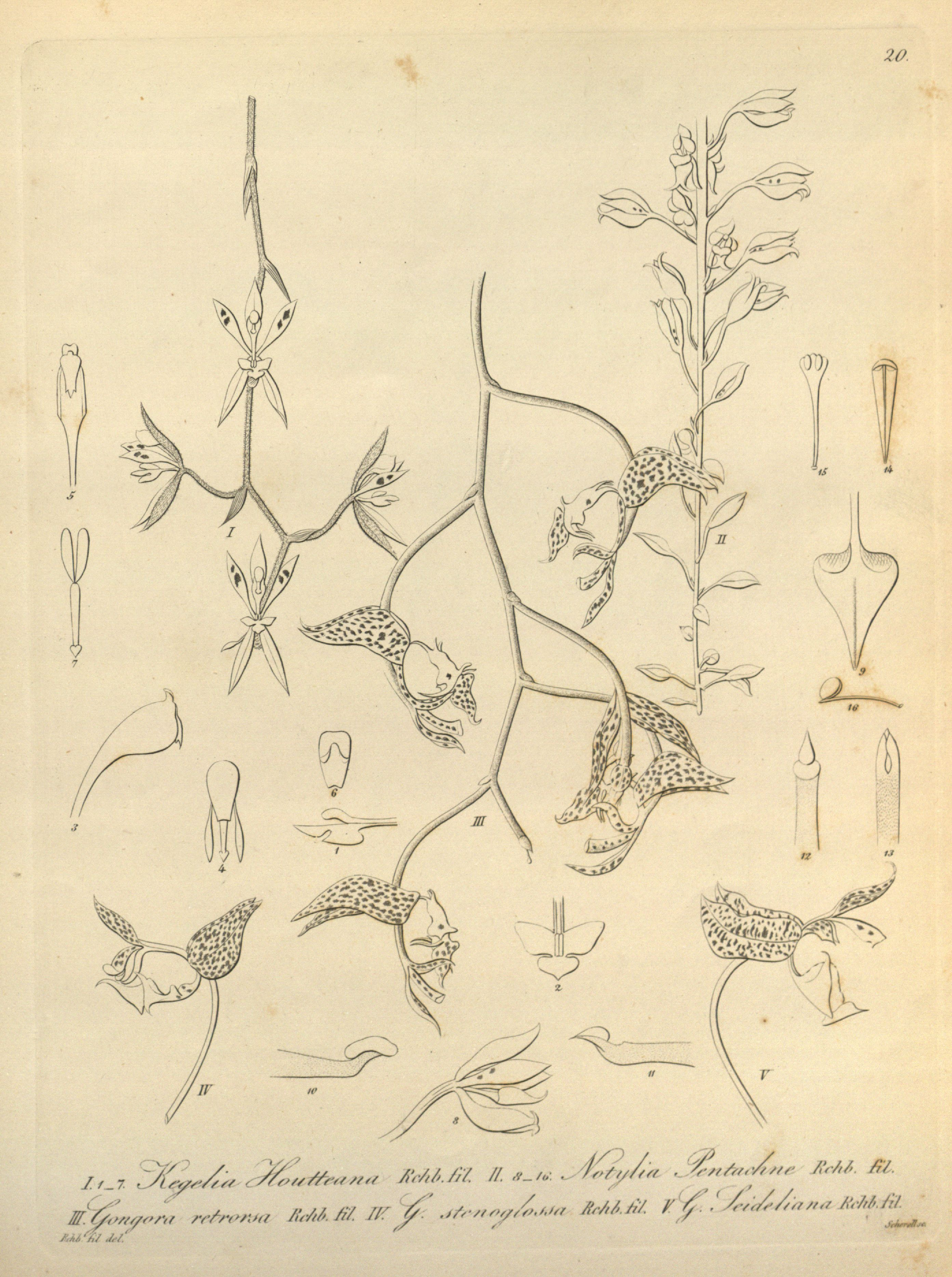
- Notylia pentachne (fig. II and 8-16, right); 1854 illustration

Scientific classification
- Kingdom: Plantae
- Clade: Tracheophytes
- Clade: Angiosperms
- Clade: Monocots
- Order: Asparagales
- Family: Orchidaceae
- Subfamily: Epidendroideae
- Genus: Notylia
- Species: N. pentachne

Binomial name
- Notylia pentachne Rchb.f.

Synonyms
- Notylia gracilispica Schltr.

= Notylia pentachne =

Species of orchid

Notylia pentachne is a species of orchid that native to Honduras, Panama, Colombia and Venezuela.
