= Sage Manifolds =

SageManifolds (following the styling of SageMath) is an extension fully integrated into SageMath, to be used as a package for differential geometry and tensor calculus. The official page for the project is sagemanifolds.obspm.fr. It can be used on CoCalc.

SageManifolds deals with differentiable manifolds of arbitrary dimension. The basic objects are tensor fields and not tensor components in a given vector frame or coordinate chart. This system allows for various charts and frames to be introduced on the manifold and a given tensor fields can have representations in each of them.

An important class of treated manifolds is that of pseudo-Riemannian manifolds, among which Riemannian manifolds and Lorentzian manifolds, with applications to General Relativity. In particular, SageManifolds implements the computation of the Riemann curvature tensor and associated objects (Ricci tensor, Weyl tensor). SageManifolds can also deal with generic affine connections, not necessarily Levi-Civita ones.

== Functionalities ==
Version	Date	Description (From Changelog)
0.1	7 July 2013	First released
0.2	12 September 2013	Defined six classes, and "many doctests changed to comply with Sage 5.11. New methods in each class.
0.3	24 November 2013	Development repository moved from svn to git. New example worksheets. More classes and methods (some inherited from Sage).
0.4	10 February 2014	New classes, members, and methods.
0.5	12 July 2014	This is a major release, involving the introduction of algebraic structures to describe tensor fields, namely modules over the algebra of scalar fields, among which free modules of finite rank. This is achieved via Sage Parent/Element scheme and coercion model.
0.6	28 September 2014	Graphical output for charts (method Chart.plot()) and points (method Point.plot()); here are some examples.; Introduction of index notation to denote tensor contractions and tensor symmetrizations (new class TensorWithIndices); see these links: 1, 2.; The argument of methods symmetrize() and antisymmetrize() in tensor classes is now directly a sequence of index positions (and no longer a single list/tuple encapsulating such a sequence).; Method self_contract() of tensor classes renamed trace().; The code for tensor contractions has been optimized; moreover multiple tensor contractions are now allowed.; The documentation (reference manuals 4 and 5) has been improved.
0.7	12 March 2015	For the end user, new features are: the introduction of curves in manifolds (with some plotting capabilities); improvements in differential mappings between manifolds, including mapping composition and mapping differential; the introduction of homomorphisms between free modules
0.8	16 May 2015	Changes for the end user: Plot of vector fields: new method VectorField.plot(); Possibility of parallelizing heavy computations: parallelization is implemented for basic tensor calculus (arithmetics, contractions) and for calculus regarding affine connections (connection coefficients, action on a tensor field, Riemann curvature tensor); Nice display of partial derivatives; Standard math functions exp, cos, sin, etc. on scalar fields; Display of tensor components as a list, one per line: new methods TensorField.display_comp() and FreeModuleTensor.display_comp(); Nice display of connection coefficients: new method AffConnection.display(); Nice display of Christoffel symbols: new method Metric.christoffel_symbols_display(); Nice display of chart transition maps: new method CoordChange.display()
0.9	10 December 2015	This is a major release, resulting from an important refactoring of the code, in view of a full integration of SageManifolds into SageMath (cf. the metaticket #18528 on the SageMath developer trac). The major changes are: Topological properties have been separated from differential ones, by implementing topological manifolds (new classTopologicalManifold) and making the class for differentiable manifolds (DifferentiableManifold) inherit from TopologicalManifold.; The base field over which manifolds are defined is no longer assumed to be the real field: it can be any topological field (non-discrete to define differentiability for diff. manifolds). This allows to define easily complex manifolds, by setting the field to C.; The class ManifoldOpenSubset has been suppressed: open subsets of manifolds are now instances of TopologicalManifold or DifferentiableManifold (since an open subset of a top/diff manifold is a top/diff manifold by itself); Functions defined on a coordinate patch are no longer necessarily symbolic functions of the coordinates: they now pertain to the generic class CoordFunction, symbolic functions being described by a subclass of it (CoordFunctionSymb). This opens the way for "numerical" manifolds, like spacetimes generated by numerical relativity codes.; Better parallelization, governed by the new singleton class Parallelism and the global function use_multiproc.
0.9.1	19 September 2016	*The full change is now listed for the Wikipedia (this) page* This release propagates further code changes related to the integration of SageManifolds into SageMath (cf. the metaticket#18528); it also adds a few new functionalities. New functionalities: Computation of the Schouten tensor, the Cotton conformal tensor and the Cotton-York conformal tensor associated to a given pseudo-Riemannian metric; Add structure of Lie algebroid to modules of vector fields (classes VectorFieldModule and VectorFieldFreeModule): new method VectorField.bracket; Parallelization of vector field plots; Parallelization of arithmetics of fully antisymmetric tensor components; Improved rendering of variables in partial derivatives, using LaTeX display of symbols (class ExpressionNice); Add comparison operator for transition maps (class CoordChange); Add list functionalities for bases (methods __len__ and __iter__ in classes FreeModuleBasis and FreeModuleCoBasis); Syntactic changes: Method CoordChange.set_inverse: replace the keyword check by verbose, the default being now verbose=False; Introduction of Manifold.options to control the display of mathematical expressions instead of the global functions nice_derivatives and omit_function_args, which have been suppressed; Function set_axes_labels (to set labels on 3D plots) no longer imported at the startup time; if required, one has to type from sage.manifolds.utilities import set_axes_labels; Function xder (exterior derivative) no longer imported at the startup time; if required, one has to type from sage.manifolds.utilities import xder; Class DiffForm: method exterior_der renamed exterior_derivative; Classes DiffScalarField, TensorField and TensorFieldParal: method lie_der renamed lie_derivative, with lie_der kept as an alias of the latter; More internal changes: Manifold structure now described via specific singleton classes: TopologicalStructure, RealTopologicalStructure, DifferentialStructure and RealDifferentialStructure; Class TopologicalManifoldSubset renamed ManifoldSubset; Class TopologicalManifoldPoint renamed ManifoldPoint; Manifold subsets are no longer facade parents; Class ManifoldSubset: new methods lift and retract; Introduction of the commutative algebra of all symbolic coordinate functions on a given chart: new class CoordFunctionSymbRing and class CoordFunction now inheritates from AlgebraElement; Class FiniteRankFreeModule: category changed from Modules(ring) to Modules(ring).FiniteDimensional(); Some changes to prepare the migration to Python 3 (e.g. print replaced by print())
1.0	11 January 2017	Besides the full integration in SageMath 7.5, there are only minor changes with respect to v0.9.1: Syntactic changes: Method plot of classes RealChart and VectorField: keyword argument nb_values renamed number_values; Method structure_coef of class VectorFrame renamed structure_coeff; Class OpenInterval: argument subinterval_of renamed ambient in the constructor; Class RealLine: LateX name changed from \RR to \Bold{R}; Internal changes: Systematic use of Python3-compatible syntax (to prepare the migration of SageMath to Python3); in particular: All occurrences of iteritems() changed to items(); All occurrences of itervalues() changed to values(); Classes ScalarField and TensorField: method __nonzero__ renamed __bool__; Class TensorField: method __div__ renamed __truediv__; Classes TensorFieldModule, VectorFieldModule and DiffFormModule: add cached method zero; Classes DiffForm and DiffFormParal: method exterior_derivative is cached (via the decorator @cached_method); Class VectorFrame: method structure_coeff is cached (via the decorator @cached_method); Other changes: Improvements in the documentation; in particular 3D graphics have been added to the reference manual for illustrating the use of some plot methods; Values set by the user to some keyword arguments of plot methods become the new default values until further explicit change (this behavior is provided by the decorator @options): TangentVector.plot: argument scale; VectorField.plot: arguments max_range, scale and color; DifferentiableCurve.plot: arguments thickness, plot_points, max_range and aspect_ratio
1.0.1	25 March 2017	
1.0.2	21 July 2017	
1.1	7 December 2017	

More documentation is on doc.sagemath.org/html/en/reference/manifolds/.

== Free & Open Software ==
As SageMath is, SageManifolds is a free and open source software based on the Python programming language. It is released under the GNU General Public License. To download and install SageManifolds, see here. It is more specifically GPL v2+ (meaning that a user may elect to use a licence higher than GPL version 2.)

== Development ==
Much of the source is on tickets at trac.sagemath.org.

There are GitHub repositories at github.com/sagemanifolds/SageManifolds.

Other links are provided at sagemanifolds.obspm.fr/contact.html.
