= Fixed-point arithmetic =

Computer format for representing real numbers

In computing, fixed-point is a method of representing fractional (non-integer) numbers by storing a fixed number of digits of their fractional part. Dollar amounts, for example, are often stored with exactly two fractional digits, representing the cents (1/100 of a dollar). More generally, the term may refer to representing fractional values as integer multiples of some fixed small unit, e.g., a fractional amount of hours as an integer multiple of ten-minute intervals. Fixed-point number representation is often contrasted to the more complicated and computationally demanding floating-point representation.

In the fixed-point representation, the fraction is often expressed in the same number base as the integer part, but using negative powers of the base b. The most common variants are decimal (base 10) and binary (base 2). The latter is commonly known also as binary scaling. Thus, if n fraction digits are stored, the value will always be an integer multiple of b^{−n}. Fixed-point representation can also be used to omit the low-order digits of integer values, for instance, when representing large dollar values as multiples of $1000 ($1K).

When decimal fixed-point numbers are displayed for human reading, the fraction digits are usually separated from those of the integer part by a radix character (usually "." in English, but "," or some other symbol in many other languages). Internally, however, there is no separation, and the distinction between the two groups of digits is defined only by the programs that handle such numbers.

Fixed-point representation was the norm in mechanical calculators. Since most modern processors have a fast floating-point unit (FPU), fixed-point representations in processor-based implementations are now used only in special situations, such as in low-cost embedded microprocessors and microcontrollers; in applications that demand high speed or low power consumption or small chip area, like image, video, and digital signal processing; or when their use is more natural for the problem. Examples of the latter are accounting of dollar amounts, when fractions of cents must be rounded to whole cents in strictly prescribed ways; and the evaluation of functions by table lookup, or any application where rational numbers need to be represented without rounding errors (which fixed-point does but floating-point cannot). Fixed-point representation is still the norm for field-programmable gate array (FPGA) implementations, as floating-point support in an FPGA requires significantly more resources than fixed-point support.

== Representation ==
Example fixed-point representation with scaling 1/100
Value represented	Internal representation
0.00	0
0.5	50
0.99	99
2	200
−14.1	−1410
314.160	31416

A fixed-point representation of a fractional number is essentially an integer that is to be implicitly multiplied by a fixed scaling factor. For example, the value 1.23 can be stored in a variable as the integer value 123 with an implicit scaling factor of 1/100. This representation allows standard integer arithmetic logic units to perform rational number calculations.

Negative values are usually represented in binary fixed-point formats as a signed integer in two's complement representation with an implicit scaling factor as above. The sign of the value will always be indicated by the most significant bit (1 = negative, 0 = non-negative), even if the number of fraction bits is greater than or equal to the total number of bits. For example, the 8-bit signed binary integer (11110101)_{2} = −11, taken with −3, +5, and +12 implied fraction bits, would represent the values −11/2^{−3} = −88, −11/2^{5} = −0.34375, and −11/2^{12} = −0.002685546875, respectively.

Alternatively, negative values can be represented by an integer in the sign-magnitude format, in which case the sign is never included in the number of implied fraction bits. This variant is more commonly used in decimal fixed-point arithmetic. Thus the signed 5-digit decimal integer (−00025)_{10}, taken with −3, +5, and +12 implied decimal fraction digits, would represent the values −25/10^{−3} = −25000, −25/10^{5} = −0.00025, and −25/10^{12} = −0.000000000025, respectively.

A program will usually assume that all fixed-point values that will be stored into a given variable, or will be produced by a given instruction, will have the same scaling factor. This parameter can usually be chosen by the programmer depending on the precision needed and the range of values to be stored.

The scaling factor of a variable or formula may not appear explicitly in the program. Coding best practices then requires that it be provided in the documentation, at least as a comment in the source code.

=== Choice of scaling factors ===
For greater efficiency, scaling factors are often chosen to be powers (positive or negative) of the base b used to represent the integers internally. However, often the best scaling factor is dictated by the application. Thus, one often uses scaling factors that are powers of 10 (e.g., 1/100 for dollar values) for human convenience, even when the integers are represented internally in binary. Decimal scaling factors also mesh well with the metric (SI) system, since the choice of the fixed-point scaling factor is often equivalent to the choice of a unit of measure (like centimeter or micron in relation to meter).

However, other scaling factors may be used occasionally, e.g., a fractional amount of hours may be represented as an integer number of seconds; that is, as a fixed-point number with a scale factor of 1/3600.

Even with the most careful rounding, fixed-point values represented with a scaling factor S may have an error of up to ±0.5 × S in the stored integer value. Therefore, smaller scaling factors generally produce more accurate results.

On the other hand, a smaller scaling factor means a smaller range of the values that can be stored in a given program variable. The maximum fixed-point value that can be stored into a variable is the largest integer value that can be stored into it, multiplied by the scaling factor, and similarly for the minimum value. For example, the table below gives the implied scaling factor S, the minimum and maximum representable values V_{min} and V_{max}, and the accuracy δ = S/2 of values that could be represented in 16-bit signed binary fixed point format, depending on the number f of implied fraction bits.

Parameters of some 16-bit signed binary fixed-point formats
f	S	δ	V_{min}	V_{max}
−3	1/2^{−3} = 8	4	−262144	262136
0	1/2^{0} = 1	0.5	−32768	+32767
5	1/2^{5} = 1/32	< 0.016	−1024.00000	+1023.96875
14	1/2^{14} = 1/16384	< 0.000031	−2.00000000000000	+1.99993896484375
15	1/2^{15} = 1/32768	< 0.000016	−1.000000000000000	+0.999969482421875
16	1/2^{16} = 1/65536	< 0.000008	−0.5000000000000000	+0.4999847412109375
20	1/2^{20} = 1/1048576	< 0.0000005	−0.03125000000000000000	+0.03124904632568359375

Fixed-point formats with scaling factors of the form 2^{n}−1 (namely 1, 3, 7, 15, 31, etc.) have been said to be appropriate for image processing and other digital signal processing tasks. They provide more consistent conversions between fixed- and floating-point values than 2^{n} scaling. The Julia programming language implements both versions.

=== Exact values ===
Any binary fraction a/2^{m}, such as 1/16 or 17/32, can be exactly represented in fixed-point, with a power-of-two scaling factor 1/2^{n} with any n ≥ m. However, most decimal fractions like 0.1 or 0.123 are infinite repeating fractions in base 2, and hence cannot be represented that way.

Similarly, any decimal fraction a/10^{m}, such as 1/100 or 37/1000, can be exactly represented in fixed point with a power-of-ten scaling factor 1/10^{n} with any n ≥ m. This decimal format can also represent any binary fraction a/2^{m}, such as 1/8 (0.125) or 17/32 (0.53125).

More generally, a rational number a/b, with a and b relatively prime and b positive, can be exactly represented in binary fixed point only if b is a power of 2; and in decimal fixed point only if b has no prime factors other than 2 or 5.

=== Comparison with floating-point ===
Fixed-point computations can be faster or use less hardware than floating-point ones. If the range of the values to be represented is known in advance and is sufficiently limited, fixed point can make better use of the available bits. For example, if 32 bits are available to represent a decimal number between 0 and 1, a fixed-point representation can have error less than 1.2×10^{−10}, whereas the IEEE 754 standard floating-point representation may have error up to 596×10^{−10} because 9 of the bits are allocated to the sign and exponent of the dynamic scaling factor which is not used over this limited range of values. For a digital audio recording requiring less than 40 dB of headroom, a 32-bit fixed-point has a higher signal-to-noise ratio than floating-point.

Programs using fixed-point computations are usually more portable than those using floating-point since they do not depend on the availability of an FPU. This advantage was particularly strong before the IEEE Floating Point Standard was widely adopted, when floating-point computations with the same data would yield different results depending on the manufacturer, and often on the computer model.

Many embedded processors lack an FPU, because integer arithmetic units require substantially fewer logic gates and consume much smaller chip area than an FPU; and software emulation of floating-point on low-speed devices would be too slow for most applications. CPU chips for the earlier personal computers and game consoles, like the Intel 386 and 486SX, also lacked an FPU.

The absolute resolution (difference between successive values) of any fixed-point format is constant over the whole range, namely the scaling factor S. In contrast, the relative resolution of a floating-point format is approximately constant over its whole range, varying within a factor of the base b; whereas its absolute resolution varies by many orders of magnitude, like the values themselves.

In many cases, the rounding and truncation errors of fixed-point computations are easier to analyze than those of the equivalent floating-point computations. Applying linearization techniques to truncation, such as dithering or noise shaping is more straightforward within fixed-point arithmetic. On the other hand, the use of fixed point requires greater care by the programmer. Avoidance of overflow requires much tighter estimates for the ranges of variables and all intermediate values in the computation, and often also extra code to adjust their scaling factors. Fixed-point programming normally requires the use of integer types of different widths. Fixed-point applications can make use of block floating point, which is a fixed-point environment having each array (block) of fixed-point data be scaled with a common exponent in a single word.

== Applications ==
A common use of decimal fixed-point is for storing monetary values, for which the complicated rounding rules of floating-point numbers are often a liability. For example, the open-source money management application GnuCash, written in C, switched from floating-point to fixed-point, as of version 1.6, for this reason.

Binary fixed-point (binary scaling) was widely used from the late 1960s to the 1980s for real-time computing that was mathematically intensive, such as flight simulation and in nuclear power plant control algorithms. It is still used in many DSP applications and custom-made microprocessors. Computations involving angles would use binary angular measurement.

Binary fixed point is used in the STM32G4 series CORDIC co-processors and in the discrete cosine transform algorithms used to compress JPEG images.

Electronic instruments such as electricity meters and real-time clocks often use polynomials to compensate for introduced errors, e.g., from temperature or power supply voltage. The coefficients are produced by polynomial regression. Binary fixed-point polynomials can offer more bits of precision than floating-point and do so in fast code using inexpensive CPUs. Accuracy, crucial for instruments, compares well to equivalent-bit floating-point calculations, if the fixed-point polynomials are evaluated using Horner's method (e.g. y = ((ax + b)x + c)x + d) to reduce the number of times that rounding occurs, and the fixed-point multiplications utilize rounding addends.

== Operations ==
=== Addition and subtraction ===
To add or subtract two values with the same implicit scaling factor, it is sufficient to add or subtract the underlying integers; the result will have their common implicit scaling factor and can thus be stored in the same program variables as the operands. These operations yield the exact mathematical result, as long as no overflow occurs—that is, as long as the resulting integer can be stored in the receiving program variable. If overflow happens, it occurs like with ordinary integers of the same signedness. In the unsigned and signed-via-two's-complement cases, the overflow behaviour is well-known as a finite group.

If the operands have different scaling factors, then they must be converted to a common scaling factor before the operation.

=== Multiplication ===
To multiply two fixed-point numbers $\frac{p}{q}$, $\frac{r}{s}$ (where p, q, r and s are all integers), it suffices to multiply the two underlying integers and assume that the scaling factor of the result ($t = q \cdot s$) is the product of their scaling factors.

$$\frac{p}{q} \cdot \frac{r}{s} = \frac{p\cdot r}{q \cdot s} =  \frac{p\cdot r}{t}$$

The result will be exact, with no rounding, provided that it does not overflow the receiving variable. With integer multiplication, the product is up to twice the width of the two factors, so to accurately represent the result, the receiving variable requires twice the width as the operands.

For example, multiplying the numbers $p = 123$ scaled by $1/q = 1/1000$ (0.123) and $r = 25$ scaled by $1/s = 1/10$ (2.5) yields the integer $p \cdot r = 123 \cdot 25 = 3075$ scaled by $1/t = 1/(q \cdot s) = (1/1000) \cdot (1/10) = 1/10000$, that is $3075/10000 = 0.3075$. As another example, multiplying the first number by 155 implicitly scaled by 1/32 ($155/32 = 4.84375$) yields the integer $123 \cdot 155 = 19065$ with implicit scaling factor $(1/1000) \cdot (1/32) = 1/32000$, that is $19065/32000 = 0.59578125$.

In binary, it is common to use a scaling factor that is a power of two. After the multiplication, the scaling factor can be divided away by shifting right. Shifting is simple and fast in most computers.

When right-shifting or a typical integer-division instruction (such as C integer division and x86 idiv) is used, the result is equivalent to a flooring division (floor(x/y)). A method with rounding can be used to reduce the error introduced. Three variations are possible based on choice of tie-breaking:

- Round-half-up is possible by adding a 'rounding addend' of half of the scaling factor before shifting. The proof: roundup(x/y) = floor(x/y + 0.5) = floor((x + y/2)/y). If y = 2^n, this is equivalent to (x + 2^(n−1)) >> n (where >> represents right shift).
- Round-half-down is, by analogy, floor((x - y/2)/y) or (x - 2^(n-1)) >> n.
- Round-half-to-even basically entails making an extra decision on top of round-half-up. It is slightly more complicated but still requires no branching on a CPU.

These rounding methods are usable in any scaling through integer division. For example, they are also applicable to the discussion on rescaling.

=== Division ===
The division of fixed-point numbers can be understood as the division of two fractions of potentially different denominators (scaling factors). With p/q and r/s (where p q r s are all integers), the naive approach is to rearrange the fraction to form a new scaling factor (s/q):

$\frac{\left(\frac{p}{q}\right)}{\left(\frac{r}{s}\right)} =\frac{p}{q} \cdot \frac{s}{r} = \frac{p}{r}\cdot \left(\frac{s}{q}\right) = \frac{p}{r} \cdot t$

For example, division of p = 3456 scaled by 1/q = 1/100 (34.56) and r = 1234 scaled by 1/s = 1/1000 (1.234) yields the integer 3456÷1234 = 3 (rounded) with scale factor (1/100)/(1/1000) = 10, that is, 30. As another example, the division of the first number by 155 implicitly scaled by 1/32 (155/32 = 4.84375) yields the integer 3456÷155 = 22 (rounded) with implicit scaling factor (1/100)/(1/32) = 32/100 = 8/25, that is 22×32/100 = 7.04.

With very similar s and q, the above algorithm results in an overly coarse scaling factor. This can be improved by first converting the dividend to a smaller scaling factor. Say we reduce the scaling factor by n times, then we instead calculate:

(p/q) / (r/s) = (np/nq) / (r/s) = (np÷r) / (s÷nq)

For example, if a = 1.23 is represented as 123 with scaling 1/100, and b = 6.25 is represented as 6250 with scaling 1/1000, then simple division of the integers yields 123÷6250 = 0 (rounded) with scaling factor (1/100)/(1/1000) = 10. If a is first converted to 1,230,000 with scaling factor 1/1000000, the result will be 1,230,000÷6250 = 197 (rounded) with scale factor 1/1000 (0.197). The exact value 1.23/6.25 is 0.1968.

A different way to think about the scaling is to consider division, the inverse operation of multiplication. If multiplication leads to a finer scaling factor, it is reasonable that the dividend needs to have a finer scaling factor as well to recover the original value given.

=== Scaling conversion ===
In fixed-point computing, it is often necessary to convert a value to a different scaling factor. This operation is necessary, for example:

- To store a value into a program variable that has a different implicit scaling factor;
- To convert two values to the same scaling factor, so that they can be added or subtracted;
- To restore the original scaling factor of a value after multiplying or dividing it by another;
- To improve the accuracy of the result of a division;
- To ensure that the scaling factor of a product or quotient is a simple power like 10^{n} or 2^{n};
- To ensure that the result of an operation can be stored in a program variable without overflow;
- To reduce the cost of hardware that processes fixed-point data.

To convert a number from a fixed point type with scaling factor R to another type with scaling factor S, the underlying integer must be multiplied by the ratio R/S. Thus, for example, to convert the value 1.23 = 123/100 from scaling factor R=1/100 to one with scaling factor S=1/1000, the integer 123 must be multiplied by (1/100)/(1/1000) = 10, yielding the representation 1230/1000.

If the scaling factor is a power of the base used internally to represent the integer, changing the scaling factor requires only dropping low-order digits of the integer, or appending zero digits. However, this operation must preserve the sign of the number. In two's complement representation, that means extending the sign bit as in arithmetic shift operations.

If S does not divide R (in particular, if the new scaling factor S is greater than the original R), the new integer may have to be rounded.

In particular, if r and s are fixed-point variables with implicit scaling factors R and S, the operation r ← r×s requires multiplying the respective integers and explicitly dividing the result by S. The result may have to be rounded, and overflow may occur.

For example, if the common scaling factor is 1/100, multiplying 1.23 by 0.25 entails multiplying 123 by 25 to yield 3075 with an intermediate scaling factor of 1/10000. In order to return to the original scaling factor 1/100, the integer 3075 then must be multiplied by 1/100, that is, divided by 100, to yield either 31 (0.31) or 30 (0.30), depending on the rounding policy used.

Similarly, the operation r ← r/s will require dividing the integers and explicitly multiplying the quotient by S. Rounding and/or overflow may occur here too.

=== Conversion to and from floating-point ===
To convert a number from floating point to fixed point, one may multiply it by the scaling factor S, then round the result to the nearest integer. Care must be taken to ensure that the result fits in the destination variable or register. Depending on the scaling factor and storage size, and on the range input numbers, the conversion may not entail any rounding.

To convert a fixed-point number to floating-point, one may convert the integer to floating-point and then divide it by the scaling factor S. This conversion may entail rounding if the integer's absolute value is greater than 2^{24} (for binary single-precision IEEE floating point) or of 2^{53} (for double-precision). Overflow or underflow may occur if |S| is very large or very small, respectively.

== Hardware support ==
=== Scaling and renormalization ===
Typical processors do not have specific support for fixed-point arithmetic. However, most computers with binary arithmetic have fast bit shift instructions that can multiply or divide an integer by any power of 2; in particular, an arithmetic shift instruction. These instructions can be used to quickly change scaling factors that are powers of 2, while preserving the sign of the number.

Early computers like the IBM 1620 and the Burroughs B3500 used a binary-coded decimal (BCD) representation for integers, namely base 10 where each decimal digit was independently encoded with 4 bits. Some processors, such as microcontrollers, may still use it. In such machines, conversion of decimal scaling factors can be performed by bit shifts and/or by memory address manipulation.

Some DSP architectures offer native support for specific fixed-point formats, for example, signed n-bit numbers with n−1 fraction bits (whose values may range between −1 and almost +1). The support may include a multiply instruction that includes renormalization—the scaling conversion of the product from 2n−2 to n−1 fraction bits. If the CPU does not provide that feature, the programmer must save the product in a large enough register or temporary variable, and code the renormalization explicitly.

=== Overflow ===
Overflow happens when the result of an arithmetic operation is too large to be stored in the designated destination area. In addition and subtraction, the result may require one bit more than the operands. In multiplication of two unsigned integers with m and n bits, the result may have m+n bits.

In case of overflow, the high-order bits are usually lost, as the un-scaled integer gets reduced modulo 2^{n} where n is the size of the storage area. The sign bit, in particular, is lost, which may radically change the sign and the magnitude of the value.

Some processors can set a hardware overflow flag and/or generate an exception on the occurrence of an overflow. Some processors may instead provide saturation arithmetic: if the result of an addition or subtraction were to overflow, they store instead the value with the largest magnitude that can fit in the receiving area and has the correct sign.

However, these features are not very useful in practice; it is generally easier and safer to select scaling factors and word sizes so as to exclude the possibility of overflow, or to check the operands for excessive values before executing the operation.

== Computer language support ==
Explicit support for fixed-point numbers is provided by a few programming languages, notably PL/I, COBOL, Ada, JOVIAL, and Coral 66. They provide fixed-point data types, with a binary or decimal scaling factor. The compiler automatically generates code to do the appropriate scaling conversions when doing operations on these data types, when reading or writing variables, or when converting the values to other data types, such as floating-point.

Most of those languages were designed between 1955 and 1990. More modern languages usually do not offer any fixed-point data types or support for scaling factor conversion. That is also the case for several older languages that are still very popular, like FORTRAN, C and C++. The wide availability of fast floating-point processors, with strictly standardized behavior, has greatly reduced the demand for binary fixed-point support. Similarly, the support for decimal floating point in some programming languages, like C# and Python, has removed most of the need for decimal fixed-point support. In the few situations that call for fixed-point operations, they can be implemented by the programmer, with explicit scaling conversion, in any programming language that supports explicit integer types.

On the other hand, all relational databases and the SQL notation support fixed-point decimal arithmetic and storage of numbers. PostgreSQL has a special numeric type for exact storage of numbers with up to 1000 digits.

Moreover, in 2008 the International Organization for Standardization (ISO) published a draft technical report to extend the C programming language with fixed-point data types, for the benefit of programs running on embedded DSP processors. Two main kinds of data types are proposed, _Fract (fractional part with a minimum 7-bit precision) and _Accum (_Fract with at least 4 bits of integer part). The GNU Compiler Collection (GCC) supports this draft.

== Detailed examples ==
=== Decimal fixed point multiplication ===
Suppose there is the following multiplication with two fixed-point, 3-decimal-place numbers.

$$\begin{align}
(10.500)(1.050)
&=1 \times 10.500 + 0.050 \times 10.500 \\
&= 10.500+0.525000=11.025000
\end{align}$$

Note how, since there are 3 decimal places, we show the trailing zeros. To re-characterize this as an integer multiplication, we must first multiply by $1000\ (=10^3)$, moving all the decimal places into integer places, then we will multiply by $1/1000\ (=10^{-3})$ to put them back. The equation now looks like

$$\begin{align}
(10.500)(10^{3}) (1.050)(10^{3})  (10^{-3})(10^{-3})
&= (10500)(1050) (10^{-6}) \\
&= 11\,025\,000  (10^{-6}) \\
&= 11.025000
\end{align}$$

This works equivalently if we choose a different base, notably base 2 for computing, since a bit shift is the same as a multiplication or division by an order of 2. Three decimal digits are equivalent to about 10 binary digits, so we should round 0.05 to 10 bits after the binary point. The closest approximation is then 0.0000110011.

$$\begin{align}
10&= 8+2=2^3+2^1\\
1&=2^0\\
0.5&= 2^{-1}\\
0.05&= 0.0000110011_2
\end{align}$$

Thus our multiplication becomes

$$\begin{align}
(1010.100)(2^3)(1.0000110011)(2^{10}) (2^{-13})
&=(1010100)(10000110011) (2^{-13})\\
&=(10110000010111100) (2^{-13})\\
&=1011.0000010111100
\end{align}$$

This rounds to 11.023 with three digits after the decimal point.

=== Binary fixed-point multiplication ===
Consider the task of computing the product of 1.2 and 5.6 with binary fixed point using 16 fraction bits. To represent the two numbers, one multiplies them by 2^{16}, obtaining 78 643.2 and 367 001.6; and round these values the nearest integers, obtaining 78 643 and 367 002. These numbers will fit comfortably into a 32-bit word with two's complement signed format.

Multiplying these integers together gives the 35-bit integer 28 862 138 286 with 32 fraction bits, without any rounding. Note that storing this value directly into a 32-bit integer variable would result in overflow and loss of the most significant bits. In practice, it would probably be stored in a signed 64-bit integer variable or register.

If the result is to be stored in the same format as the data, with 16 fraction bits, that integer should be divided by 2^{16}, which gives approximately 440 401.28, and then rounded to the nearest integer. This effect can be achieved by adding 2^{15} and then shifting the result by 16 bits. The result is 440 401, which represents the value 6.719 985 961 914 062 5. Taking into account the precision of the format, that value is better expressed as 6.719 986 ± 0.000 008 (not counting the error that comes from the operand approximations). The correct result would be 1.2 × 5.6 = 6.72.

For a more complicated example, suppose that the two numbers 1.2 and 5.6 are represented in 32-bit fixed-point format with 30 and 20 fraction bits, respectively. Scaling by 2^{30} and 2^{20} gives 1 288 490 188.8 and 5 872 025.6, that round to 1 288 490 189 and 5 872 026, respectively. Both numbers still fit in a 32-bit signed integer variable, and represent the fractions

1.200 000 000 186 264 514 923 095 703 125 and
5.600 000 381 469 726 562 50

Their product is (exactly) the 53-bit integer 7 566 047 890 552 914, which has 30+20 = 50 implied fraction bits and therefore represents the fraction

6.720 000 458 806 753 229 623 609 513 510

If we choose to represent this value in signed 16-bit fixed format with 8 fraction bits, we must divide the integer product by 2^{50−8} = 2^{42} and round the result; which can be achieved by adding 2^{41} and shifting by 42 bits. The result is 1720, representing the value 1720/2^{8} = 6.718 75, or rather the interval between 3439/2^{9} and 3441/2^{9} (approximately 6.719 ± 0.002).

== Notations ==
Various notations have been used to concisely specify the parameters of a fixed-point format. In the following list, f represents the number of fractional bits, m the number of magnitude or integer bits, s the number of sign bits (0/1 or some other alternative representation), and b the total number of bits.

- The Q notation was defined by Texas Instruments. One writes Qf to specify a signed binary fixed-point value with f fraction bits; for example, Q15 specifies a signed integer in two's complement notation with a scaling factor 1/2^{15}. The code Qm.f specifies additionally that the number has m bits in the integer part of the value, not counting the sign bit. Thus Q1.30 would describe a binary fixed-point format with 1 integer bit and 30 fractional bits, which could be stored as a 32-bit 2's complement integer with scaling factor 1/2^{30}.
  - A similar notation has been used by ARM, except that they count the sign bit in the value of m; so the same format above would be specified as Q2.30.
  - The Embedded C proposal uses .f for unsigned fraction. s.f for signed fraction, m.f for unsigned accumulator, and sm.f for signed accumulator. This would translate the above to s1.30, though this is not a valid type for either fraction or accumulator: in valid versions, m is at least 4 and depending on the underlying type f is at least 7, 15, or 23. Note the non-italicized s: it is simply prepended as a letter.
- The COBOL programming language originally supported decimal fixed-precision with arbitrary size and decimal scaling, whose format was specified "graphically" with the PIC directive. For example, PIC S9999V99 specified a sign-magnitude 6-digit decimal integer with two decimal fraction digits.
- The construct REAL FIXED BINARY (p,f) is used in the PL/I programming language, to specify a fixed-point signed binary data type with p total bits (not including sign) with f bits in the fraction part; that is a p+1 bit signed integer with a scaling factor of 1/2^{f}. The latter could be positive or negative. One could specify COMPLEX instead of REAL, and DECIMAL instead of BINARY for base 10.
- In the Ada programming language, a numeric data type can be specified by, for example,type F is delta 0.005 range -50.0 .. 50.0. The decimal bounds are translated to the next power of two, hence it means a fixed-point representation consisting of a signed binary integer in two's complement format with at least 8 fraction bits (providing a scaling factor 1/256) and 7 sign-and-magnitude bits (ensuring an actual range from −64.00 to almost +64.00): a minimum total of 15 bits. On a 16-bit computer, the spare bit is assigned to the fractional part. Asymmetrical range constraints are also allowed, though the underlying implementation remains symmetric about 0. Newer versions of Ada allow specifying an exact (including non-power-of-two) scaling factor using 'Small => 0.005 (aspect specification), or, if the factor is a power of 10, through a decimal fixed point.
- The notation Bm has been used to mean a fixed binary format with m bits in the integer part; the rest of the word (typically 32 bits) being fraction bits. For example, the maximum and minimum values that can be stored in a signed B16 number are ≈32767.9999847 and −32768.0, respectively.
- The VisSim company used fxm.b to denote a binary fixed-point value with b total bits and m bits in the integer part; that is, a b-bit integer with scaling factor 1/2^{b−m}. Thus fx1.16 would mean a 16-bit number with 1 bit in the integer part and 15 in the fraction.
- The PS2 GS ("Graphics Synthesizer") User's Guide uses the notation s:m:f, where s specifies the presence (0 or 1) of sign bit. For example, 0:5:3 represents an unsigned 8-bit integer with a scaling factor of 1/2^{3}.
- The LabVIEW programming language uses the notation <s,b,m> to specify the parameters of an 'FXP' fixed point numbers. The s component can be either '+' or '±', signifying either an unsigned or 2's complement signed number, respectively. The b component is the total number of bits, and m is the number of bits in the integer part.

== Software application examples ==
- The popular TrueType font format uses 32-bit signed binary fixed-point with 26 bits to the left of the decimal for some numeric values in its instructions. This format was chosen to provide the minimal amount of precision required for hinting and for performance reasons.
- With the exception of the Nintendo 64, all 3D games for the fifth generation of video game consoles, including the 3DO, PlayStation, Sega Saturn, and Atari Jaguar use fixed-point arithmetic, as the systems lack hardware floating-point units. The PlayStation transformation coprocessor supports 16-bit fixed point with 12 fraction bits - whereas the Sega Saturn VDP coprocessors used a 32-bit fixed point format, reserving the lower 16 bits for the fractional part.
- The TeX typesetting software, widely used by scientists and mathematicians, uses 32-bit signed binary fixed point with 16 fraction bits for all position calculations. The values are interpreted as fractions of a typographer's point. TeX font metric files use 32-bit signed fixed-point numbers, with 12 fraction bits.
- Tremor, Toast and MAD are software libraries which decode the Ogg Vorbis, GSM Full Rate and MP3 audio formats respectively. These codecs use fixed-point arithmetic because many audio decoding hardware devices do not have an FPU.
- The WavPack lossless audio compressor uses fixed-point arithmetic. The choice was justified by, among other things, the worry that different floating-point rounding rules in different hardware could corrupt the lossless nature of the compression.
- The Nest Labs Utilities library, provides a limited set of macros and functions for fixed-point numbers, particularly when dealing with those numbers in the context of sensor sampling and sensor outputs.
- The OpenGL ES 1.x specification includes a fixed point profile, as it is an API aimed for embedded systems, which do not always have an FPU.
- The dc and bc programs are arbitrary precision calculators, but only keep track of a (user-specified) fixed number of fractional digits.
- Fractint represents numbers as Q2.29 fixed-point numbers, to speed up drawing on old PCs with 386 or 486SX processors, which lacked an FPU.
- Doom was the last first-person shooter game by id Software to use a 16.16 fixed point representation for all of its non-integer computations, including map system, geometry, rendering, and player movement. This representation is still used in modern Doom source ports.
- The Q# programming language for the Azure quantum computers, which implement quantum logic gates, contains a standard numeric library for performing fixed-point arithmetic on registers of qubits.

== See also ==
- A-law algorithm
- Block floating-point scaling
- Libfixmath - a library written in C for fixed-point math
- Logarithmic number system
- Minifloat
- Modulo operation
- Q (number format)
- Rational data type
- μ-law algorithm
