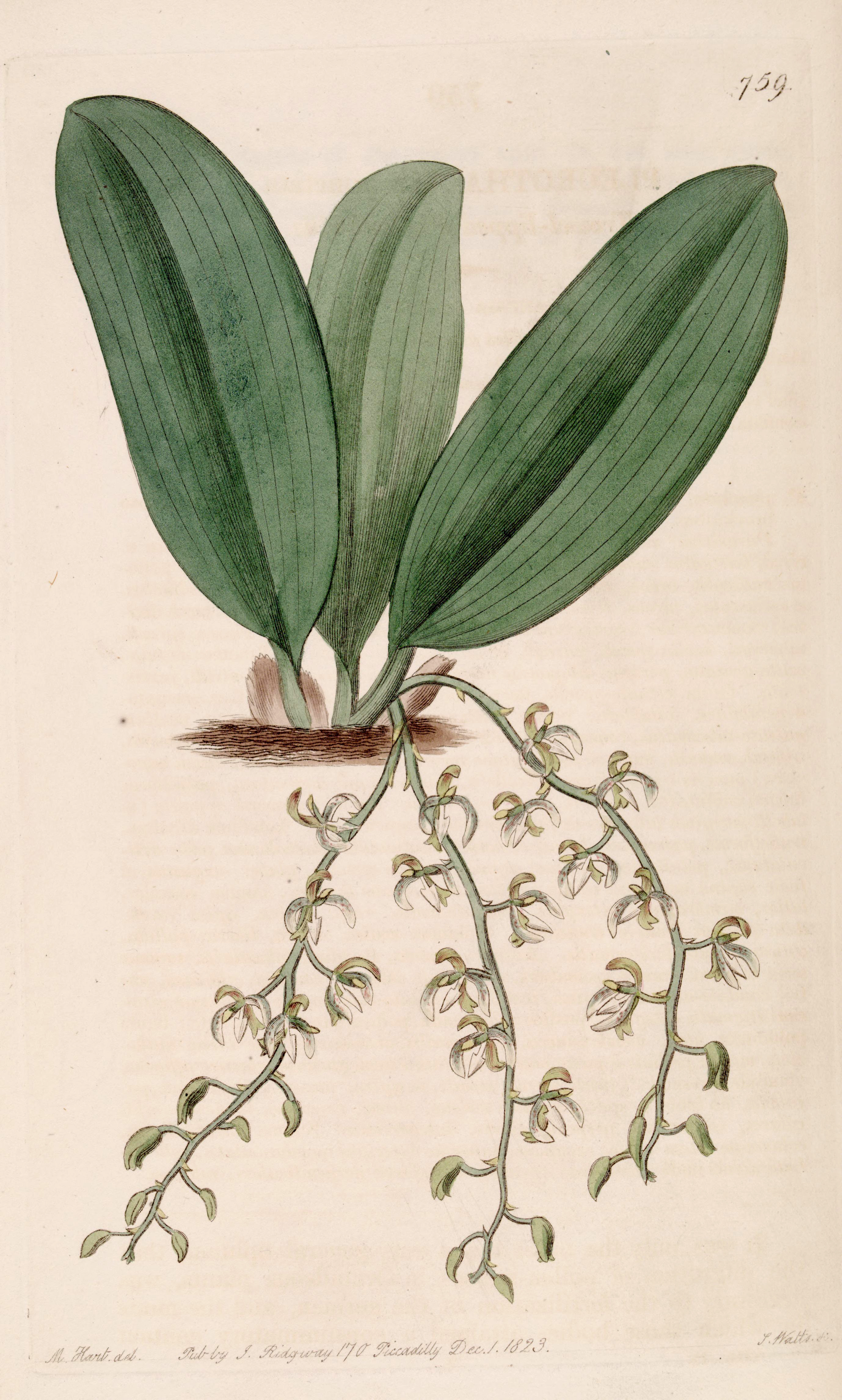
- Notylia punctata 1823 illustration

Scientific classification
- Kingdom: Plantae
- Clade: Tracheophytes
- Clade: Angiosperms
- Clade: Monocots
- Order: Asparagales
- Family: Orchidaceae
- Subfamily: Epidendroideae
- Genus: Notylia
- Species: N. punctata

Binomial name
- Notylia punctata Rchb.f.

Synonyms
- Pleurothallis punctata Ker Gawl. (basionym); Gomesa tenuiflora Lodd.; Humboldtia punctata (Ker Gawl.) Kuntze; Notylia apiculata Cogn.; Notylia broadwayi Cogn.

= Notylia punctata =

Species of orchid

Notylia punctata is a species of orchid that occurs from Trinidad, northern Venezuela, and the State of Pará in Brazil.
