= Mwrank =

mwrank
- Developer(s): J. E. Cremona and others
- Stable release: v20160206 / February 6, 2016; 9 years ago
- Repository: github.com/JohnCremona/eclib
- Written in: C++
- Operating system: Linux
- Type: Mathematical software
- License: GPL
- Website: homepages.warwick.ac.uk/staff/J.E.Cremona/mwrank/index.html

mwrank is one in a suite of programs for computing elliptic curves over rational numbers. Other programs in the suite compute conductors, torsion subgroups, isogenous and quadratic twists of curves. mwrank is written in C++ and is free software released under the GNU General Public License.
