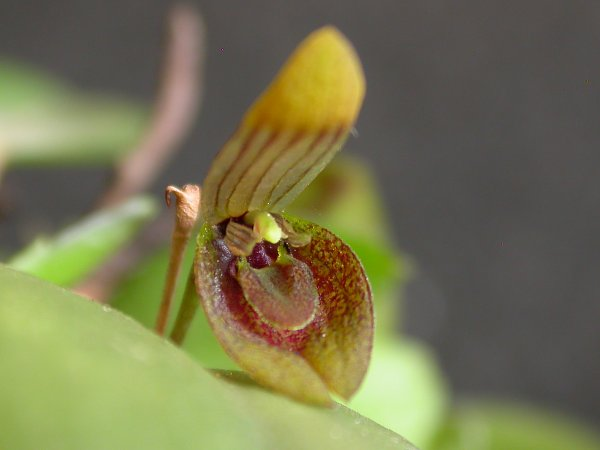

Scientific classification
- Kingdom: Plantae
- Clade: Tracheophytes
- Clade: Angiosperms
- Clade: Monocots
- Order: Asparagales
- Family: Orchidaceae
- Subfamily: Epidendroideae
- Genus: Acianthera
- Species: A. serpentula

Binomial name
- Acianthera serpentula (Barb.Rodr.) F. Barros (2003)

Synonyms
- Pleurothallis serpentula Barb.Rodr. (1881) (Basionym); Pleurothallis punctata Barb.Rodr. (1877); Pleurothallis serpentula var. major Cogn. (1896)

= Acianthera serpentula =

Species of orchid

Acianthera serpentula is a species of orchid. It is native to the South American Atlantic Forest.

The species was first described by João Barbosa Rodrigues in 1877, who originally named it Pleurothallis punctata, before renaming it to Pleurothallis serpentula in 1882. It was transferred to the genus Acianthera by Fábio de Barros in 2003.

A. serpentula is distinguished from other plants in its genus by "the shape of its oblong, slightly pandurate lip".
