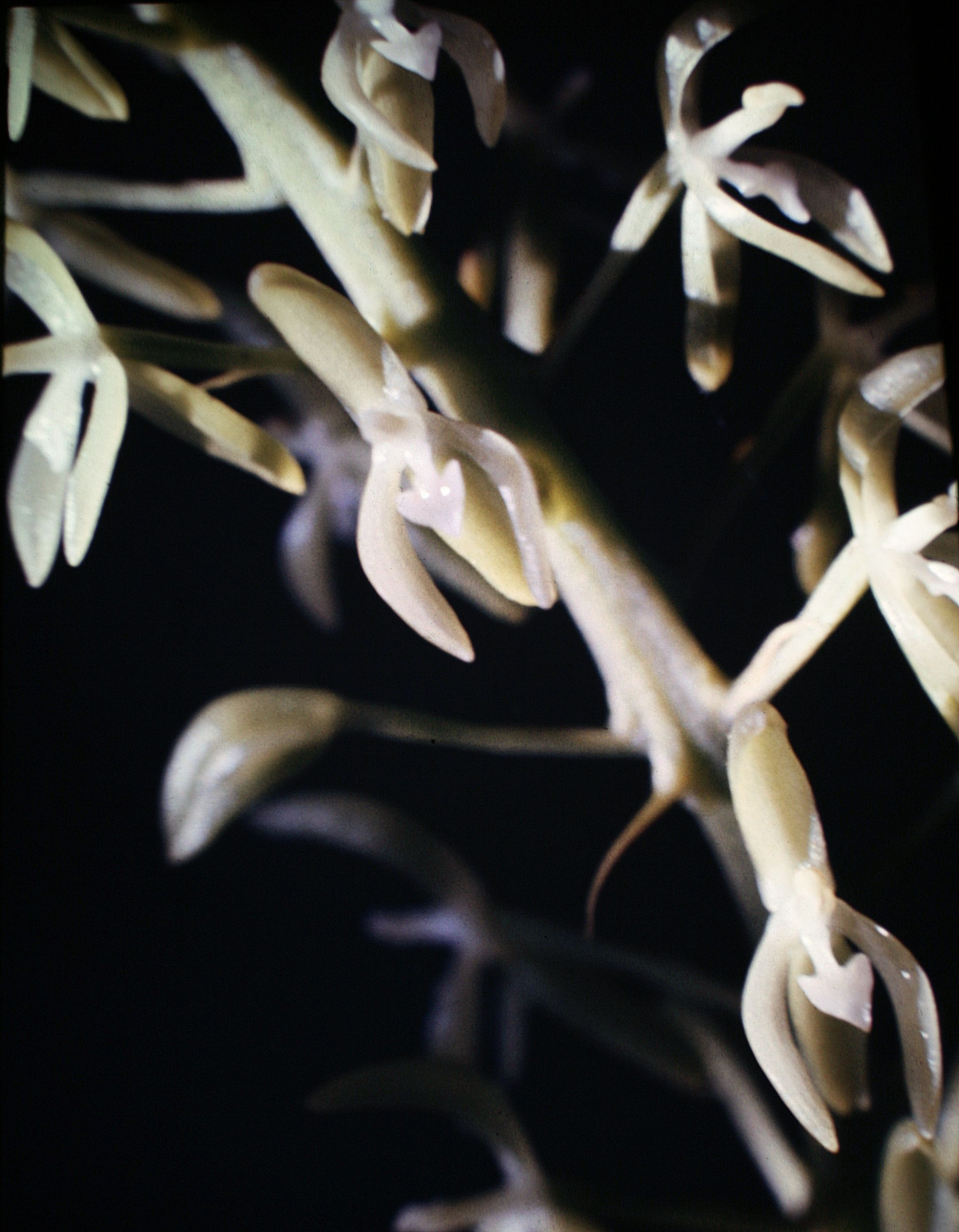
- Notylia sagittifera

Scientific classification
- Kingdom: Plantae
- Clade: Tracheophytes
- Clade: Angiosperms
- Clade: Monocots
- Order: Asparagales
- Family: Orchidaceae
- Subfamily: Epidendroideae
- Tribe: Cymbidieae
- Subtribe: Oncidiinae
- Genus: Notylia; Lindl.

Type species
- Notylia punctata (Ker Gawl.) Lindl.

Synonyms
- Tridachne Liebm. ex Lindl. & Paxton

= Notylia =

Genus of orchids

Notylia, abbreviated Ntl in horticultural trade, is a genus of orchids. It consists of 56 recognized species, native to Mexico, Central America, Trinidad and South America.

Species currently recognized as of June 2014:

1. Notylia albida Klotzsch (1851)
2. Notylia angustifolia Cogn. (1910)
3. Notylia arachnites Rchb.f. (1859)
4. Notylia aromatica Barker ex Lindl. (1841)
5. Notylia barkeri Lindl. (1838)
6. Notylia bernoullii Schltr. (1918)
7. Notylia bisepala S.Moore (1895)
8. Notylia brenesii Schltr. (1923)
9. Notylia buchtienii Schltr. (1912)
10. Notylia bungerothii Rchb.f. (1887)
11. Notylia carnosiflora C.Schweinf. (1946)
12. Notylia durandiana Cogn. (1904)
13. Notylia ecuadorensis Schltr. (1917)
14. Notylia flexuosa Schltr. (1925)
15. Notylia fragrans Wullschl. ex H.Focke (1853)
16. Notylia glaziovii Cogn. (1904)
17. Notylia guatemalensis S.Watson (1887)
18. Notylia hemitricha Barb.Rodr. (1881)
19. Notylia incurva Lindl. (1838)
20. Notylia inversa Barb.Rodr. (1881)
21. Notylia koehleri Schltr. (1912)
22. Notylia lankesteri Ames (1923)
23. Notylia latilabia Ames & C.Schweinf. (1925)
24. Notylia laxa Rchb.f. (1881)
25. Notylia lehmanniana Kraenzl. (1921)
26. Notylia leucantha Salazar (1999)
27. Notylia longispicata Hoehne & Schltr. (1926)
28. Notylia lyrata S.Moore (1895)
29. Notylia micrantha Lindl. (1838)
30. Notylia microchila Cogn. (1904)
31. Notylia morenoi Christenson (2001)
32. Notylia nemorosa Barb.Rodr. (1881)
33. Notylia obtusa Schltr. (1920)
34. Notylia odontonotos Rchb.f. & Warm. in H.G.Reichenbach (1881)
35. Notylia orbicularis A.Rich. & Galeotti (1845)
36. Notylia panamensis Ames (1922)
37. Notylia parvilabia C.Schweinf. (1946)
38. Notylia pentachne Rchb.f. (1854)
39. Notylia peruviana (Schltr.) C.Schweinf. (1946)
40. Notylia pittieri Schltr. (1918)
41. Notylia platyglossa Schltr. (1914)
42. Notylia pubescens Lindl. (1842)
43. Notylia punctata (Ker Gawl.) Lindl. (1842)
44. Notylia punoensis D.E.Benn. & Christenson (2001)
45. Notylia replicata Rchb.f. (1878)
46. Notylia rhombilabia C.Schweinf. (1946)
47. Notylia rimbachii Schltr. (1921)
48. Notylia sagittifera (Kunth) Link (1841)
49. Notylia stenantha Rchb.f. (1865)
50. Notylia stenoglossa Schltr. (1913)
51. Notylia sylvestris L.B.Sm. & S.K.Harris (1937)
52. Notylia tamaulipensis Rchb.f. (1860)
53. Notylia tapirapoanensis Hoehne (1910)
54. Notylia trisepala Lindl. & Paxton (1852)
55. Notylia venezuelana Schltr. (1919)
56. Notylia yauaperyensis Barb.Rodr. (1891)
