= Number Theory Library =

NTL
- Developers: Victor Shoup and others
- Stable release: 11.5.1 / June 23, 2021; 4 years ago
- Written in: C++
- Operating system: Cross-platform
- Type: Software library
- License: LGPL
- Website: www.shoup.net/ntl/

NTL is a C++ library for doing number theory. NTL supports arbitrary length integer and arbitrary precision floating point arithmetic, finite fields, vectors, matrices, polynomials, lattice basis reduction and basic linear algebra. NTL is free software released under the GNU Lesser General Public License v2.1.

== See also ==
- List of open-source mathematical libraries
