= GNU Multiple Precision Arithmetic Library =

Free software

- Developer: GNU Project
- Initial release: 1991; 35 years ago
- Stable release: 6.3.0 / 30 July 2023
- Written in: C, (C++, assembly optionally)
- Type: Mathematical software
- License: Dual LGPLv3 – GPLv2
- Website: gmplib.org
- Repository: gmplib.org/repo/

GNU Multiple Precision Arithmetic Library (GMP) is a free library for arbitrary-precision arithmetic, operating on signed integers, rational numbers, and floating-point numbers. There are no practical limits to the precision except the ones implied by the available memory (operands may be of up to 2^{32}−1 bits on 32-bit machines and 2^{37} bits on 64-bit machines). GMP has a rich set of functions, and the functions have a regular interface. The basic interface is for C, but wrappers exist for other languages, including Ada, C++, C#, Julia, .NET, OCaml, Perl, PHP, Python, R, Ruby, and Rust.

Before 2008, Kaffe, a Java virtual machine, used GMP to support Java built-in arbitrary precision arithmetic. Shortly after, GMP support was added to GNU Classpath, as the backends to java.math.BigInteger and java.math.BigDecimal.

The main target applications of GMP are cryptography applications and research, Internet security applications, and computer algebra systems.

GMP aims to be faster than any other arbitrary-precision arithmetic (big number) library for all operand sizes. Some important factors in doing this are:

- Full words are the basic type for all arithmetic.
- Different algorithms are used for different operand sizes; algorithms which are more efficient with large numbers are not used when dealing with small numbers.
- Assembly language (specialized for different processors) is used in the most common inner loops to optimize them as much as possible.

The first GMP release was made in 1991. It is constantly developed and maintained.

GMP is part of the GNU project (although its website being off gnu.org may cause confusion), and is distributed under the GNU Lesser General Public License (LGPL).

GMP is used for integer arithmetic in many computer algebra systems such as Mathematica and Maple. It is also used in the Computational Geometry Algorithms Library (CGAL).

GMP is needed to build the GNU Compiler Collection (GCC).

== C library interface ==
The C library interface defines:

- mpz_t (multiprecision integer)
- mpq_t (multiprecision rational)
- mpf_t (multiprecision floating-point number)
- gmp_randstate_t (random state, used for producing random numbers)

Functions are prefixed with the type name (for example, operations on multiprecision integers are prefixed with mpz, etc.)

The library also provides additional utilities (all prefixed with gmp), such as gmp_scanf, gmp_printf, etc.

=== Example ===
Here is an example of C code showing the use of the GMP library to multiply and print large numbers:

#include <stdio.h>
#include <gmp.h>

int main(void) {
    mpz_t x, y, result;

    mpz_init_set_str(x, "7612058254738945", 10);
    mpz_init_set_str(y, "9263591128439081", 10);
    mpz_init(result);

    mpz_mul(result, x, y);
    gmp_printf(
        "    %Zd\n"
        "*\n"
        "    %Zd\n"
        "--------------------\n"
        "%Zd\n",
        x, y, result
    );

    // free used memory
    mpz_clear(x);
    mpz_clear(y);
    mpz_clear(result);

    return 0;
}

This code calculates the value of $7612058254738945 \times 9263591128439081$.

Compiling and running this program gives this result. (The -lgmp flag is used if compiling on Unix-type systems.)

    7612058254738945
*
    9263591128439081
--------------------
70514995317761165008628990709545

== C++ library interface ==
The C++ library interface defines the classes:

- mpz_class (corresponds to mpz_t)
- mpq_class (corresponds to mpq_t)
- mpf_class (corresponds to mpf_t)
- gmp_randclass (offers random number utilities)

The free-standing functions in the C library are integrated as methods in the C++ classes. The C++ library places all symbols globally, and does not use a library namespace. It is recommended to avoid auto in declarations. For returning to the C type, each class offers a corresponding get_mp_t() method (for example mpz_class::get_mpz_t()).

=== Example ===
For comparison, one can write instead the following equivalent C++ program. (The -lgmpxx -lgmp flags are used if compiling on Unix-type systems.)

import <gmpxx.h>;
import std;

int main() {
    mpz_class x("7612058254738945");
    mpz_class y("9263591128439081");
    mpz_class result = x * y;

    std::println(
        "    {}\n"
        "*\n"
        "    {}\n"
        "--------------------\n"
        "{}",
        x.get_str(), y.get_str(), result.get_str()
    );

    return 0;
}

== Language bindings ==
Library name	Language	License
GNU Multi-Precision Library	C, C++	LGPL
Math::GMP	Perl	LGPL
Math::GMPz, Math::GMPf and Math::GMPq	Perl	Artistic License v1.0 + GPL v1.0-or-later
General Multiprecision Python Project	Python	LGPL
R package 'gmp'	R	GPL
The RubyGems project	Ruby	Apache 2.0
Rust FFI bindings for GMP, MPFR and MPC	Rust	LGPL
GNU Multi-Precision Library for PHP	PHP	PHP
GNU Multi-Precision Routines for SBCL	Common Lisp	Public domain
Ch GMP	Ch	Proprietary
Parallel GMP Wrapper for BMDFM	BMDFM LISP – C	Public domain
Glasgow Haskell Compiler (The implementation of Integer is basically a binding to GMP)	Haskell	BSD
luajit-gmp	LuaJIT	MIT
gmp-wrapper-for-delphi	Delphi	MIT
Zarith	OCaml	LGPL
Math.Gmp.Native Library	.NET	MIT
nim-gmp	Nim	MIT
JGMP	Java	LGPL

== See also ==
- GNU MPFR – library for arbitrary-precision computations with correct rounding, based on GNU MP
- CLN – class library for arbitrary precision
- List of open-source mathematical libraries
- MPIR – fork of GMP, unmaintained
