= Mathematical software =

Software used in mathematical applications

Mathematical software is software used to model, analyze or calculate numeric, symbolic or geometric data.

== Evolution of mathematical software ==
Mathematical knowledge of techniques such as algorisms which existed before the invention of the electronic computer, helped to develop mathematical software. On the other hand, due to the growth of computing power (such as Moore's law), the new treatment (for example, a new kind of technique such as data assimilation which combined numerical analysis and statistics) needed the progress of the mathematical science or applied mathematics.
The progress of mathematical information presentation such as TeX or MathML will demand to evolution form formula manipulation language to true mathematics manipulation language (not withstanding the problem that whether mathematical theory is inconsistent or not). And popularisation of general purpose mathematical software, special purpose mathematical software so called one purpose software which use special subjects will adapt for environmental progress at the normalisation of the platform, keeping the diversity of mathematical software.

== Software calculator ==
A software calculator allows the user to perform simple mathematical operations, like addition, multiplication, exponentiation and trigonometry. Data input is typically manual, and the output is a text label.

- DeskCalc
- Desmos
- Mac OS calculator
- Calculator (Nintendo Switch)
- GeoGebra
- GNOME Calculator
- KCalc
- Qalculate!
- Windows Calculator
- WRPN Calculator
- xcalc

== Educational mathematics software ==
- Accelerated Math
- Algebrator
- Cantor
- DataScene
- Desmos
- DrGeo
- GeoGebra
- Mathletics
- Maths Pathway
- Mathspace
- Microsoft Math Solver
- StatCrunch
- Statistics Online Computational Resource
- Symbolab
- TK Solver
- WolframAlpha
- Zearn

=== Mathematical education video games ===
- DragonBox
- Tux, of Math Command

== Computer algebra systems ==
Many mathematical suites are computer algebra systems that use symbolic mathematics. They are designed to solve classical algebra equations and problems in human readable notation.

- Axiom
- Cadabra
- FriCAS
- GAP
- GNU Octave
- Magma
- Magnus
- Maple
- Mathcad
- Mathematica
- Mathomatic
- Maxima
- PARI/GP
- REDUCE
- SageMath
- Scilab
- SMath Studio
- Symbolic Math Toolbox (MATLAB)
- SymPy
- Wolfram Alpha
- Xcas / Giac
- Yacas

== Solvers ==
A solver is a piece of mathematical software, possibly in the form of a stand-alone computer program or as a software library, that 'solves' a mathematical problem. A solver takes problem descriptions in some sort of generic form and calculates their solution. In a solver, the emphasis is on creating a program or library that can easily be applied to other problems of similar type.

=== Equation solvers ===
- Maxima
- Mathematica
- Maple
- SageMath
- SymPy

=== Optimization software ===
- ADMB
- ALGLIB
- AIMMS
- AMPL
- ANTIGONE
- APMonitor
- ASCEND
- BARON
- CasADi
- COIN-OR
- Concorde TSP Solver
- Couenne
- CPLEX
- CUTEr
- Dlib
- FICO Xpress
- Galahad library
- GEKKO
- GLPK
- Gurobi Optimizer
- HiGHS
- IPOPT
- Lp solve
- MIDACO
- MiniZinc
- MINOS
- MINUIT
- MOSEK
- NEOS Server
- OpenMDAO
- OR-Tools
- Pyomo
- SCIP
- SciPy
- SNOPT
- TOMLAB
- WORHP

=== SMT solvers ===
- CVC
- Yices
- Z3 Theorem Prover

=== Theorem-provers ===
- ACL2
- Coq (now Rocq)
- HOL Light
- HOL4
- Isabelle
- Lean
- Metamath
- Mizar
- NuPRL
- Twelf

== Cryptography ==
- Botan
- Bouncy Castle
- BSAFE
- cryptlib
- Crypto++
- GnuTLS
- JCA / JCE
- Libgcrypt
- libsodium
- Mbed TLS
- NaCl
- Nettle
- NSS
- OpenSSL
- wolfCrypt

== Statistics ==
=== Statistical software ===
- ADaMSoft
- ADMB
- Alt-Ergo
- Alteryx
- Analytica
- Angoss
- ASReml
- BMDP
- BV4.1
- CARINE
- Chronux
- CSPro
- DAP
- Dataplot
- DataGraph
- EViews
- FAME
- Fityk
- GAUSS
- GeoDA
- Genedata
- GenStat
- GLIM
- GNU Octave
- GraphPad InStat
- GraphPad Prism
- gretl
- Igor Pro
- IMSL Numerical Libraries
- jamovi
- JASP
- JMulTi
- JMP
- KNIME
- LabPlot
- LIBSVM
- LIMDEP
- LISREL
- MATLAB
- Mathematica
- MedCalc
- MINUIT
- Minitab
- MLwiN
- Mondrian
- NAG Numerical Library
- NCSS
- Neural Designer
- NLOGIT
- nQuery Sample Size Software
- O-Matrix
- OpenBUGS
- OpenEpi
- OpenMx
- OpenNN
- Orange
- OriginPro
- Pandas
- PASS Sample Size Software
- Perl Data Language
- Ploticus
- Primer-E Primer
- PSPP
- PV-WAVE
- Qlucore
- RapidMiner
- R
- RATS
- ROOT
- Salstat
- S-PLUS
- SAS
- Scilab
- SciPy
- Shogun (toolbox)
- Simfit
- SOCR
- SOFA Statistics
- SPSS
- SPSS Modeler
- Stan
- StatCrunch
- Statgraphics
- Statistica
- StatsDirect
- StatXact
- Stata
- SYSTAT
- TOPCAT
- Torch
- WarpPLS
- Weka
- WinBUGS
- Winpepi
- Wolfram Language
- World Programming System
- X-13ARIMA-SEATS
- XploRe

== Theorem provers and proof assistants ==
=== Proof assistants ===
- ACL2
- Agda
- Albatross
- ETPS
- F*
- HOL theorem prover
- HOL Light
- HOL4
- Isabelle
- Jape
- Lean
- LEGO
- Matita
- Metamath
- MINLOG
- Mizar
- Nqthm
- NuPRL
- PhoX
- PVS
- Rocq
- Theorem Proving System
- Twelf

=== Theorem provers ===
- Alt-Ergo
- Automath
- CARINE
- CVC
- E
- IsaPlanner
- LCF
- Mizar
- NuPRL
- Paradox
- Prover9
- PVS
- ResearchCyc
- SPARK (programming language)
- Twelf
- Wolfram Mathematica
- Z3 Theorem Prover

== Geometry ==
- Archimedes Geo3D
- Cabri Geometry
- CaRMetal
- Cinderella
- Dr. Geo
- GeoGebra
- Geometry Expert
- GEUP
- Kig
- KSEG
- The Geometer's Sketchpad
- TracenPoche
- WIRIS

== Numerical analysis ==
The Netlib repository contains various collections of software routines for numerical problems, mostly in Fortran and C. Commercial products implementing many different numerical algorithms include the IMSL, NMath and NAG libraries; a free alternative is the GNU Scientific Library. A different approach is taken by the Numerical Recipes library, where emphasis is placed on clear understanding of algorithms.

Many computer algebra systems (listed above) can also be used for numerical computations.

== Music mathematics software ==
Music mathematics software utilizes mathematics to analyze or synthesize musical symbols and patterns.

- jMusic
- Musimat (by Gareth Loy)
- OpenMusic
- Opusmodus
- Rubato Composer
- SuperCollider
- UPIC

== Physics ==
- Comparison of electromagnetic simulation software
- List of cosmological computation software
- List of computational fluid dynamics software
- List of software for Monte Carlo molecular modeling

== Websites ==
A growing number of mathematical software is available in web browsers, without the need to download or install any code.

- Desmos
- GeoGebra
- Google Colaboratory
- Jupyter Notebook
- Kaggle
- KaTeX
- OpenPlaG
- Overleaf
- SageMath – CoCalc
- Symbolab
- WolframAlpha

== Biomathematics ==
- List of bioinformatics software
- Biostatistics software
- List of systems biology modeling software
- List of systems biology visualization software

== Mathematical chemistry ==
- List of quantum chemistry and solid-state physics software
- Comparison of software for molecular mechanics modeling

== Mathematical modeling and simulations ==
- Conway's Game of Life

== Mathematical and numerical libraries ==
=== C ===
==== Open-source ====
- Basic Linear Algebra Subprograms
- Fastest Fourier Transform in the West
- GNU MPFR
- GNU Multi-Precision Library
- GNU Scientific Library
- hypre
- Integer set library
- Libfixmath
- OpenBLAS
- UMFPACK

==== Proprietary ====
- Intel Math Kernel Library

=== C++ ===
==== Open-source ====
- Adept
- Advanced Simulation Library
- Armadillo
- Blitz++
- Boost.uBLAS
- CGAL
- Class Library for Numbers
- deal.II
- Eigen
- GetFEM++
- IML++
- IT++
- LAPACK++
- Matrix Template Library
- MFEM
- Multiple Precision Integers and Rationals
- Number Theory Library
- SU2 code
- Template Numerical Toolkit
- Trilinos

=== Fortran ===
==== Open-source ====
- ARPACK
- Automatically Tuned Linear Algebra Software
- BLAS
- BLIS
- EISPACK
- LAPACK
- Librsb
- LINPACK
- Lis
- MINPACK
- PETSc
- QUADPACK
- SLATEC
- SOFA

==== Proprietary ====
- IMSL Numerical Libraries
- NAG Numerical Library

=== Java ===
==== Open-source ====
- Colt
- Efficient Java Matrix Library
- JAMA
- Matrix Toolkit Java
- ojAlgo
- Parallel Colt

==== Proprietary ====
- OptimJ
- SuanShu numerical library

=== .NET ===
==== Open-source ====
- Accord.NET
- Math.NET Numerics
- Meta.Numerics

==== Proprietary ====
- ALGLIB
- NMath

=== Perl ===
==== Open-source ====
- Perl Data Language

=== Python ===
==== Open-source ====
- CuPy
- Dask
- Manim
- Matplotlib
- NetworkX
- NumPy
- PyMC
- SciPy
- SymPy
- Theano

== List of mathematical software ==
- Axiom
- Calcpad
- Desmos
- GeoGebra
- GNU Octave
- gnuplot
- KCalc
- Maple (software)
- Mathematica
- Mathcad
- Maxima (software)
- Microsoft Mathematics
- MuPAD
- MATLAB
- R (programming language)
- SageMath
- SciPy
- Matlab Simulink
- SymPy
- TeX
- TI-Nspire
- Wolfram Alpha

== Mathematical notation software ==
- AUCTeX
- Authorea
- Apache OpenOffice Math
- AsciiMath
- Calligra Words – Formula editor
- CoCalc
- GeoGebra
- GNOME LaTeX
- GNU TeXmacs
- Gummi
- KaTeX
- Kile
- LaTeX
- LibreOffice Math
- LyX
- MathJax
- MathML
- MathType
- Notepad++
- Overleaf
- Scientific WorkPlace
- TeX
- Texmaker
- TeXnicCenter
- TeXShop
- TeXstudio
- TeXworks
- Verbosus
- Vim
- Visual Studio Code –
- WinEdt
- WinFIG
- WinShell

== Spreadsheet software ==
- Apache OpenOffice Calc
- Airtable
- Calligra Sheets
- Coda
- GNU Oleo
- Gnumeric
- Google Sheets
- KSpread
- LibreOffice Calc
- Lotus 1-2-3
- Microsoft Excel
- Numbers
- PlanMaker
- Pyspread
- Quattro Pro
- sc
- Smartsheet
- WPS Office
- Zoho Sheet

== Mathematical art software ==
- Apophysis
- Electric Sheep
- Fractint
- Fyre
- Mandelbulb
- MilkDrop
- openPlaG
- Ultra Fractal
- XaoS
- R, R Mandelbrot sets
- Sterling
- Bryce
- Picogen
- Terragen
- GeoGebra
- Desmos
- Grapher
- Winplot
- Processing
- Grasshopper 3D
- P5.js
- matplotlib
- gnuplot
- Inkscape spirograph
- Wolfram Mathematica
- Houdini
- MATLAB
- TouchDesigner
- Unity (with math plugins)
- LaTeX (PGF/TikZ, PGFPlots)
- Manim
- D3.js

== Artificial intelligence for mathematics ==
- AlphaDev – algorithm discovery
- AlphaEvolve – mathematical and algorithm discovery
- AlphaGeometry – geometry problem solving
- AlphaTensor – matrix multiplication discovery
- FunSearch – mathematical discovery
- Ramanujan machine – conjecture discovery

== See also ==
- Computational mathematics
- Comparison of formula editors
- Gödel's incompleteness theorems
- List of information graphics software
- List of MATLAB software and tools
- List of open-source software for mathematics
- Mathlete
- MathOverflow
- Plot (graphics)
- Time complexity
