= List of interactive geometry software =

Interactive geometry software (IGS) or dynamic geometry environments (DGEs) are computer programs which allow one to create and then manipulate geometric constructions, primarily in plane geometry. In most IGS, one starts construction by putting a few points and using them to define new objects such as lines, circles or other points. After some construction is done, one can move the points one started with and see how the construction changes.

== History ==
The earliest IGS was the Geometric Supposer, which was developed in the early 1980s. This was soon followed by Cabri in 1986 and The Geometer's Sketchpad.

== Comparison ==
There are three main types of computer environments for studying school geometry: supposers, dynamic geometry environments (DGEs) and Logo-based programs. Most are DGEs: software that allows the user to manipulate ("drag") the geometric object into different shapes or positions. The main example of a supposer is the Geometric Supposer, which does not have draggable objects, but allows students to study pre-defined shapes. Nearly all of the following programs are DGEs. For a related, comparative physical example of these algorithms, see Lenart Sphere.

=== License and platform ===
The table below provides a first comparison of the different software according to license and platform.

Software	Cost (USD)	License	Platforms
Cabri Geometry	?	Proprietary	Windows, macOS
C.a.R.	Free	GPL	Windows, Linux, macOS
CaRMetal	Free	GPL	Windows, Linux, macOS
Cinderella 1.4	Free	Proprietary	Windows, Linux, macOS (Java)
Cinderella 2.0	Free	Proprietary	Windows, Linux, macOS (Java)
DrGeo	Free	GPL	Windows, Linux, macOS
GeoGebra	Free/Paid	GeoGebra License	Windows, Linux, macOS
Geom	Free	?	Windows, macOS, Linux
iGeom	Free	Proprietary*	Linux, macOS, Windows (Java*/JavaScript)
The Geometer's Sketchpad	70.02	Proprietary	Windows, macOS (Java)
Geometry Expert (GEX)	?	?	Windows, Linux, macOS
GEUP	?	Proprietary	Windows
Kig	Free	GPL	Linux
KSEG	Free	GPL	Windows, Linux, macOS
WIRIS	?	Proprietary	Linux, Windows, macOS (Java)

==== 3D software ====
Software	Cost (USD)	License	Platforms
Archimedes Geo3D	Shareware	Proprietary	Windows, macOS, Linux
GeoGebra (from version 5.0 beta)	Free or paid	GeoGebra License	Windows, Linux, macOS, Android, iOS/iPadOS, Windows RT
GEUP 3D	?	Proprietary	Windows
Yenka 3D Shapes	Free for non-commercial use	Proprietary	Windows
WIRIS	?	Proprietary	Windows, Linux, macOS

=== General features ===
The following table provides a more detailed comparison:

Software	Calculations	Macros	Loci	Animations	Scripting	Assignments	LaTeX export	Web export	Multilingual	Proofs	Extra
Cabri II Plus	Yes	Yes	Yes	Yes	Yes	Yes (with plug-in)	No	Yes	Yes	Yes (on relations)	Available on TI Calculator
Calques 3D	Yes	Yes	Yes	Yes	No	No	No	No	Yes (FRA ENG DEU ESP PTG)	Yes (on relations)	Experimental connection with some CAS
CaR	Yes	Yes	Yes	Yes	Yes	Yes	Yes	Yes	Yes	No	?
CaRMetal	Yes (recursive)	Yes	Yes	Yes (multiple)	Yes (JavaScript)	Yes	Yes	Yes	Yes	Yes (probabilistic)	Amodality, folder system, the Monkey
Cinderella	Yes	Yes	Yes	Yes	Yes	Yes	Yes (PDF)	Yes	Yes	Probabilistic	Several geometries, Physics simulations
Ganja.js	Yes	Yes	Yes	Yes	Yes	Yes	No	Yes	No	No	2D and 3D, projective and conformal, Geometric Algebra.
GCLC	Yes	Yes	Yes	Yes	Yes	Yes	Yes	No	No	Yes	Readable proofs, support for 3D
GeoGebra	Yes	Yes	Yes	Yes	Yes (JavaScript)	No	Yes (PSTricks & PGF/TikZ)	Yes	Yes (55 languages)	Yes	CAS, HTML5 Export (from version 4.2); 3D & Automatic Proof (from version 5.0)
Geometria	Yes	No	Yes	Yes	No	Yes	No	Yes	Yes	No	Two-role (teacher, student) model
Geometrix	Yes	No	Yes	Yes	No	Yes	No	No	Yes	Yes	Interactive proof, diagram checking, teacher/student models, labels with dynamic placeholders
Geometry Expressions	Yes	No	Yes	Yes	No	No	Yes	Yes (Interactive HTML5/JS Apps)	Yes	No	Symbolic calculations, which can be copied as input for CAS, TeX, and source code in 21 formats/languages. Functions. Arcs on any function or curve. Website for exported HTML5 Canvas and JavaScript Interactive Apps (Euclid's Muse).
GeoNext	Yes	No	No	Yes	?	?	No	?	Yes	No	Available as a web app
Géoplan-Géospace	Yes	Yes	Yes	Yes	Yes	No	No	Yes (activeX)	Yes	Yes	Sequences, 2D & 3D, human readable file format
GeoProof	Yes	No	No	No	No	No	Yes	No	No	Yes	Automatic formal proofs
GEUP	Yes	Yes	Yes	Yes	Yes	No	?	No	Yes	No	CAD functionality through CADGEUP
iGeom	Yes	Yes	Yes	No	Yes	Yes	No	Yes	Yes	Probabilist	Recurrent scripts
Kig	Yes	Yes	Yes	No	Yes (Python)	No	Yes (PSTricks)	No	Yes	No	Labels with dynamic placeholders
Live Geometry	Yes	Yes	Yes	Yes	No	No	No	No	No	No	Includes player.
Sarit2d	Yes	Yes	Yes	Yes	Yes	Yes	Yes	Yes	No	Yes	Available on web
Sketchpad	Yes	Yes	Yes	Yes	Yes	No	?	Yes (limited)	Yes	No	Functions & function plots, symbolic differentiation, mathematical notation
Tabula	Yes	Yes	Yes	Yes	No	No	No	No	No	No	Folding, cutting, taping, marker, and working instrument models.
Tabulae	Yes	Yes	Yes	No	No	No	No	Yes	Yes	No	Collaborative sessions over the internet.
Cabri 3D	Yes	No	No	Yes	No	No	No	Yes (limited)	Yes	No	?
Archimedes Geo3D	Yes	Yes	Yes	Yes	No	No	No	No	No (Eng De Fr)	No	Intersection of Loci
GEUP 3D	Yes	Yes	Yes	Yes	Yes	No	No	No	Yes	No	CAD functionality through CADGEUP
Netpad	Yes	Yes	Yes	Yes	No	No	No	Yes	No	Yes	Base on Web
Software	Calculations	Macros	Loci	Animations	Scripting	Assignments	LaTeX export	Web export	Multilingual	Proofs	Extra

=== Macros ===
Features related to macro constructions: (TODO)

Software	Allows recursity	Allows saving
Cabri II Plus	Yes	Yes
Calques 3D	No	Yes
GCLC	No	No
GeoGebra	Yes	Yes
Géoplan-Géospace	Yes	Yes
GEUP	Yes	Yes
iGeom	Yes	Yes
Kig	?	Yes
KSEG	Yes	Yes
Sketchpad (GSP)	Yes (via Iteration)	Yes

=== Loci ===
Loci features related to IGS: (TODO)

Software	Take a point of a locus	Intersection of two loci
Cabri II Plus	Yes	Yes
Calques 3D	No	No
CaR	Yes	Yes
GeoGebra	Yes	No
Géoplan-Géospace	Yes	No
GEUP	Yes	Yes
iGeom	Yes	No
Kig	Yes	No
Sketchpad (GSP)	Yes	No
NetPad	Yes	Yes

=== Proof ===
We detail here the proof related features. (TODO)

Software	Interactive proofs	Automatic proofs	Probabilistic proofs
Cabri II Plus	Feedback for	No	Yes in Cabri I
Cinderella	No	Using external CAS	Yes
GCLC	No	Yes	No
GeoGebra	Yes	Yes	No
Geometrix	Yes	Yes	No
Géoplan-Géospace	No	No	Yes
GeoProof	Yes	Yes	No
iGeom	No	No	Yes
Jeometry	No	Yes	No
NetPad	Yes	Yes	?

=== Measurements and calculation ===
Measurement and calculation features related to IGS: (TODO)

Software	Arbitrary precision	Arithmetic expressions	Trigonometric functions	If	Object existence test
Cabri	Yes	Yes	Yes	Yes	No
Calques 3D	No	Yes	Yes	No	No
C.a.R.	No	Yes	Yes	Yes	Yes
GCLC	No	Yes	Yes	Yes	Yes
GeoGebra	No	Yes	Yes	Yes	Yes (JavaScript)
Geometria	No	Yes	Yes	No	No
Géoplan-Géospace	No	Yes	Yes	Yes (μ function)	No
GeoProof	Yes	Yes	Yes	Yes	No
Geometrix	No	Yes	Yes	Yes	No
iGeom	No	Yes	Yes	No	No
NetPad	Yes	Yes	Yes	Yes	No

=== Graphics export formats ===
Software	PNG	BMP	TIFF	GIF	SWF	SVG	EMF	Fig	Postscript	Pdf	LaTeX/Eukleides	LaTeX/Pstricks	LaTeX/PGF/TikZ	Asymptote
Calques 3D	No	No	No	No	No	No	No	Yes	No	No	No	No	No	No
C.a.R.	Yes	No	?	?	?	Yes	No	Yes	Yes	No	No	Yes	?	?
Cinderella	Yes	Yes	?	?	?	?	?	?	No	Yes	?	?	?	?
GCLC	No	Yes	No	No	No	Yes	No	No	Yes	No	No	Yes	Yes	No
GeoGebra	Yes	No	No	Yes (animated)	No	Yes	Yes	No	Yes	Yes	No	Yes	Yes	Yes
Geometry Expressions	Yes	Yes	Yes	Yes (animated)	No	No	Yes	No	Yes	No	?	?	?	?
GeoProof	Yes	No	?	?	?	Yes	No	No	No	No	Yes	No	?	?
Kig	Yes	Yes	?	?	?	Yes	No	Yes	Yes	Yes	No	Yes	?	?
KmPlot	Yes	Yes	?	?	?	Yes	?	?	?	?	?	?	?	?
KSEG	Yes	Yes	?	?	?	$\alpha$	No	No	?	No	No	No	?	?
Geometrix	No	Yes	Yes	Yes	Yes	Yes	No	No	No	No	No	No	?	?
iGeom	No	No	No	Yes	No	No	No	No	Yes	No	No	No	?	?

=== Object attributes ===
Software	Color	Filled/not filled	Width	Transparency	Shown/hidden	Layer	Shape of points	Type of line
Cabri	Yes	Yes	Yes	Yes	Yes	No	Yes	Yes
Calques 3D	Yes	Yes	Yes	No	Yes	Yes	Yes	Yes
C.a.R.	Yes	Yes	Yes	Yes	Yes	Yes	Yes	Yes
GCLC	Yes	Yes	Yes	No	Yes	Yes	Yes	Yes
GeoGebra	Yes	Yes	Yes	Yes	Yes	Yes	Yes	Yes
Geometria	Yes	Yes	No	Yes	Yes	Yes	No	Yes
Geometry Expressions	Yes	Yes	Yes	Yes	Yes	Yes	No (but size)	Yes
Géoplan-Géospace	Yes	Yes	Yes	Yes	Yes	No	Yes	Yes
Kig	Yes	Yes	Yes	No	Yes	No	Yes	Yes
GeoProof	Yes	No	Yes	No	Yes	Yes	Yes	Yes
Geometrix	Yes	Yes	Yes	No	Yes	No	Yes	Yes
GEUP	Yes	Yes	Yes	Yes	Yes	No	Yes	Yes
iGeom	Yes	Yes	Yes	No	Yes	No	No	Yes
Sketchpad	Yes	Yes	Yes	Yes	Yes	?	Yes	Yes
NetPad	Yes	Yes	Yes	Yes	Yes	Yes	No (but size)	Yes

== 2D programs ==
=== C.a.R. ===
C.a.R. is a free GPL analog of The Geometer's Sketchpad (GSP), written in Java.

=== Cabri ===
Cabri Cabri was developed by the French school of mathematics education in Grenoble (Laborde, 1993)

=== CaRMetal ===
CaRMetal is a free GPL software written in Java. Derived from C.a.R., it provides a different user interface.

=== Cinderella ===
Cinderella, written in Java, is very different from The Geometer's Sketchpad. The later version Cinderella.2 also includes a physics simulation engine and a scripting language. Also, it now supports macros, line segments, calculations, arbitrary functions, plots, etc. Full documentation is available online.

=== Dr Genius ===
Dr Genius was an attempt to merge Dr. Geo and the Genius calculator.

=== Dr. Geo ===
Dr. Geo is a GPL interactive software intended for younger students (7-15). The later version, Dr. Geo II, is a complete rewrite of Dr. Geo, for the Squeak/Smalltalk environment.

=== GCLC ===
GCLC is a dynamic geometry tool for visualizing and teaching geometry, and for producing mathematical illustrations. In GCLC, figures are described rather than drawn. This approach stresses the fact that geometrical constructions are abstract, formal procedures and not figures. A concrete figure can be generated on the basis of the abstract description. There are several output formats, including LaTeX, LaTeX/PStricks, LaTeX/Tikz, SVG and PostScript. There is a built-in geometry theorem prover (based on the area method). GCLC is available for Windows and Linux. WinGCLC is a Windows version of GCLC with a graphical interface that provides a range of additional functionalities. GCLC is open source software (licence CC BY-ND).

=== GeoGebra ===
GeoGebra is software that combines geometry, algebra and calculus for mathematics education in schools and universities. It is available free of charge for non-commercial users.

- License: open source under GPL license (free of charge)
- Languages: 55
- Geometry: points, lines, all conic sections, vectors, parametric curves, locus lines
- Algebra: direct input of inequalities, implicit polynomials, linear and quadratic equations; calculations with numbers, points and vectors
- Calculus: direct input of functions (including piecewise-defined); intersections and roots of functions; symbolic derivatives and integrals (built-in CAS); sliders as parameters
- Parametric graphs: Yes
- Implicit polynomials: Yes
- Web export: all constructions exportable as web pages as a Java applet
- Macros: usable both as tools with the mouse and as commands in the input field
- Animation: Yes
- Spreadsheet: Yes, the cells can contain any GeoGebra object (numbers, points, functions etc.)
- Dynamic text: Yes (including LaTeX)
- Platforms: Mac OS, Unix/Linux, Windows (any platform that supports Java 1.5 or later)
- Continuity: uses a heuristic 'near-to-approach' to avoid jumping objects

=== GeoKone.NET ===
GeoKone.NET is an interactive recursive natural geometry (or "sacred geometry") generator that runs in a web browser. GeoKone allows the user to create geometric figures using naturalistic rules of recursive copying, such as the golden ratio.

=== Geolog ===
Geolog is a logic programming language for finitary geometric logic.

=== Geometry Expressions ===
Geometry Expressions does symbolic geometry. It uses real symbolic inputs and returns real and symbolic outputs. It emphasises use with a computer algebra system (CAS), and exporting and sharing via interactive HTML5, Lua, and macOS dashboard widget apps.

=== The Geometer's Sketchpad ===
The Geometer's Sketchpad (GSP)

- Deterministic
- Languages: English, Spanish, Danish, Russian, Korean, Thai, Traditional and Simplified Chinese, French, Lithuanian (current version); others (older versions)
- Macros: Yes ("custom tools" and "scripts")
- Java-applet: Yes
- Animation: Yes
- Locus: Yes, including point on locus
- Assignments: No
- Measurement/calculations: Yes
- Platform: Windows, Mac OS, TI-92+, works under Wine
- Proofs: No

=== The Geometric Supposer ===
The Geometric Supposer

=== Geonext ===
Geonext was developed by the University of Bayreuth until 2007 and is completely implemented in Java. Its final version was 1.74.

=== GeoProof ===
GeoProof is a free GPL dynamic geometry software, written in OCaml.

=== GEUP ===
GEUP is a more calculus-oriented analog of The Geometer's Sketchpad.

- Deterministic
- Languages: English, French, German, Italian, Portuguese, Spanish
- Macros: Yes
- Java-applet: No
- Animation: Yes
- Locus: Yes, including point on locus
- Assignments: No
- Measurement/calculations: Yes
- Platform: Windows
- Proofs: No

=== GRACE ===
GRACE (The Graphical Ruler And Compass Editor) is an analog of The Geometer's Sketchpad (GSP), written in Java.

=== Jeometry ===
Jeometry is a dynamic geometry applet.

=== Kig ===
Kig is a free (GPL) analog of The Geometer's Sketchpad (GSP) for KDE, but more calculus-oriented. It is a part of the KDE Edutainment Project.

=== KmPlot ===
KmPlot is a mathematical function plotter released under the free GPL license. Includes a powerful parser and precision printing in correct scale. Simultaneously plot multiple functions and combine function terms to build new functions. Supports functions with parameters and functions in polar coordinates. Several grid modes are available. Features include:

- powerful mathematical parser
- precise metric printing
- different plot types (functions, parametric, polar)
- highly configurable visual settings (plot line, axes, grid)
- export to bitmap format (BMP and PNG) and to Scalable Vector Graphics (SVG)
- save/load complete session in readable XML format
- trace mode: cross-hair following plot, coordinates shown in the status bar
- zooming support
- ability to draw the 1st and 2nd derivative and the integral of a plot function
- support user-defined constants and parameter values
- various tools for plot functions: find minimum/maximum point, get y-value and draw the area between the function and the y-axis

=== KSEG ===
KSEG is a free (GPL) analog of The Geometer's Sketchpad (GSP) with some unique features. This software can handle heavy, complex constructions in Euclidean geometry.

- Deterministic
- Languages: Dutch, English, French, Chinese, German, Hungarian, Italian, Japanese, Norwegian Bokmål, Portuguese, Russian, Spanish, Turkish, Welsh
- Macros: Yes. Editable and with support for recursion
- Java-applet: No
- Animation: No
- Locus: Yes, but no direct way to place a point on a locus.
- Assignments: No
- Measurement/calculations: Yes (the calculator is a bit strange)
- Platform: Unix/Linux, Windows, Mac OS (any platform that supports Qt)
- Proofs: No
- Extra: Editable

=== Live Geometry ===
Live Geometry is a free CodePlex project that lets you create interactive ruler and compass constructions and experiment with them. It is written in Silverlight 4 and C# 4.0 (Visual Studio 2010). The core engine is a flexible and extensible framework that allows easy addition of new figure types and features. The project has two front-ends: WPF and Silverlight, which both share the common DynamicGeometry library.

=== TracenPoche ===
TracenPoche is a completely Adobe Flash program. It is available in English, Spanish, and French.

== 3D programs ==
=== Cabri 3D ===
Cabri Geometry

=== Archimedes Geo3D ===
Archimedes Geo3D is a shareware program designed for 3D geometric constructions. It extends traditional ruler and compass constructions into 3D space, allowing users to work with elements such as points, lines, circles, planes, spheres, vectors, and loci. This software is compatible with Windows, macOS, and Linux platforms.

=== Euler 3D ===
Euler (software)

Euler 3D is a program that allows you to create and manipulate your own polyhedrons. It has a number of facilities: transformations, animations, creating duals, import/export VRML, etc.

Free registration required.

=== GeoGebra ===
GeoGebra, includes a 3D mode since version 5.0

=== Geomview ===
Geomview

=== GEUP 3D ===
GEUP

== Continuity versus determinism ==
All these programs can be divided into two categories: deterministic and continuous. GeoGebra can be deterministic or continuous (one can change it in preferences).

All constructions in the deterministic programs (GSP, Cabri, Kseg and most of others) are completely determined by the given points but the result of some constructions can jump or behave unexpectedly when a given point is moved.

On the contrary, some constructions in continuous programs (so far only Cinderella and GeoGebra), depend on the number of hidden parameters and in such a way that moving a given point produces a continuous motion of the construction, as a result, if the point is moved back to the original position the result of construction might be different.

Here is a test to check whether a particular program is continuous:

Construct the orthocenter of triangle and three midpoints (say A', B' C' ) between vertices and orthocenter.

Construct a circumcircle of A'B'C' .

This is the nine-point circle, it intersects each side of the original triangle at two points: the base of altitude and midpoint. Construct an intersection of one side with the circle at midpoint now move opposite vertex of the original triangle, if the constructed point does not move when base of altitude moves through it that probably means that your program is continuous.

Although it is possible to make a deterministic program which behaves continuously in this and similar simple examples, in general it can be proved that no program can be continuous and deterministic at the same time.

== See also ==
- List of open-source software for mathematics
- Mathematical software
- Constructive solid geometry
- Lénárt sphere
