= GeoGebra =

Interactive geometry, algebra and calculus application

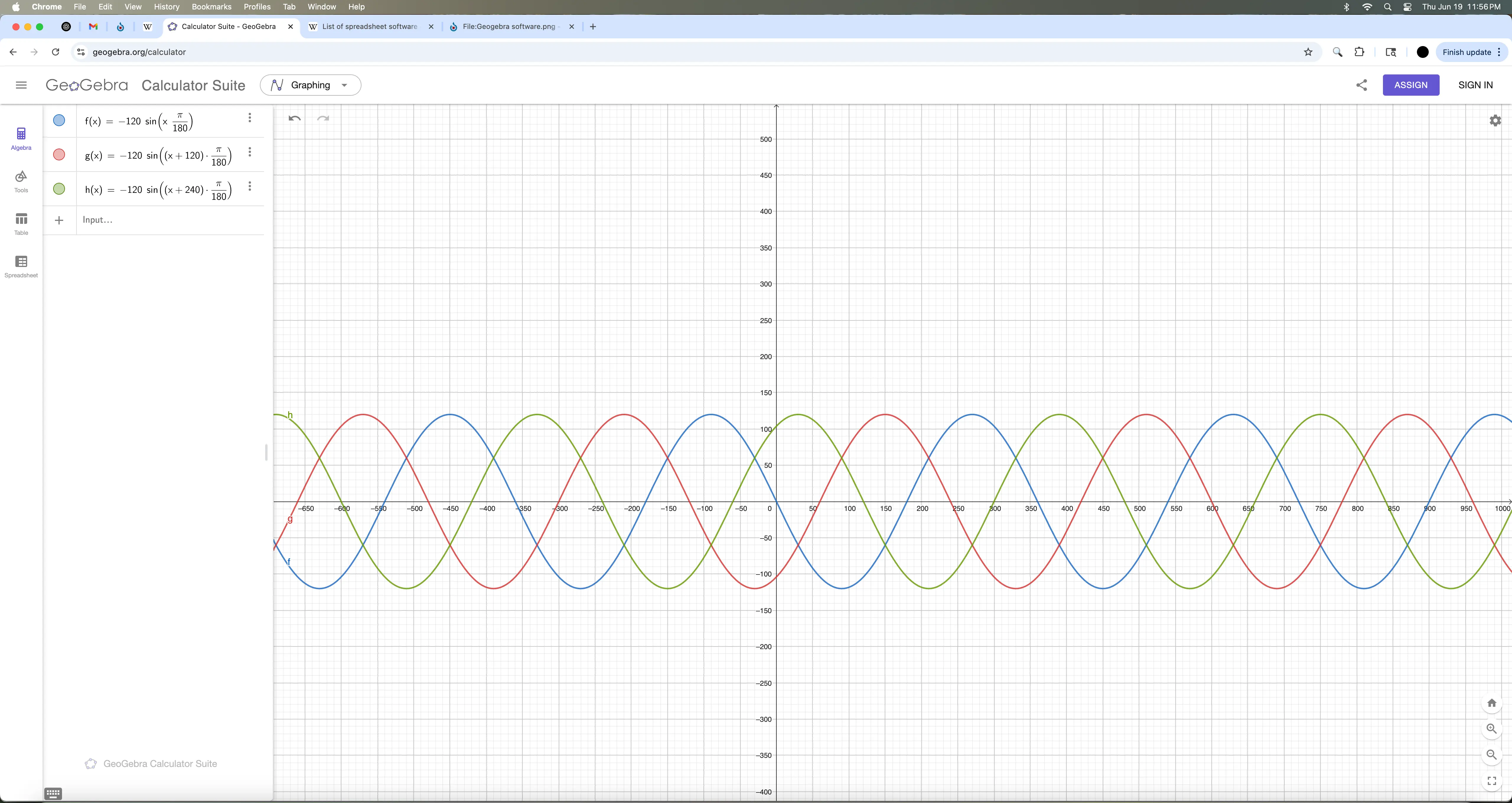
- GeoGebra web application
- Developer: Markus Hohenwarter et al
- Stable release: 6.0.929 (19 August 2026; 24 days ago) [±]
- Preview release: (none) [±]
- Written in: Java
- Operating system: Windows, macOS, ChromeOS, Linux; also a web app
- Type: Interactive geometry software
- License: GeoGebra License; Non-commercial freeware; portions under GPL, CC-BY-NC-SA
- Website: www.geogebra.org
- Repository: github.com/geogebra/geogebra

GeoGebra (a portmanteau of geometry and algebra) is an interactive geometry, algebra, statistics and calculus application, intended for learning and teaching mathematics and science from primary school to university level. GeoGebra is available on multiple platforms, with apps for desktops & laptops (Windows, macOS and Linux), phones & tablets (Android, iPhone/iPad and Windows RT), web. As of 2025, it is owned by Indian edutech firm Byju's.

== History ==
GeoGebra's creator, Markus Hohenwarter, started the project in 2001 as part of his master's thesis at the University of Salzburg. After a successful Kickstarter campaign, GeoGebra expanded its offering to include an iOS/iPadOS, Android, and Windows Store app versions. In 2013, GeoGebra incorporated Bernard Parisse's Xcas into its CAS view. The project is now freeware (with open-source portions) and multi-lingual, and Hohenwarter continues to lead its development at the University of Linz.

GeoGebra includes both commercial and not-for-profit entities that work together from the head office in Linz, Austria, to expand the software and cloud services available to users.

In December 2021, GeoGebra was acquired by edtech conglomerate Byju's for approximately $100 million USD.

On January 25, 2024, lenders began bankruptcy proceedings against GeoGebra's parent company Byju's in an effort to repay its loans. On February 1, 2024, Byju's U.S. division filed for Chapter 11 bankruptcy in Delaware. Byju's would raise around $200 million in an effort to clear "immediate liabilities" and for other operational costs.

== Features ==
GeoGebra is an interactive mathematics software suite for learning and teaching science, technology, engineering, and mathematics from primary school up to the university level. Constructions can be made with points, vectors, segments, lines, polygons, conic sections, inequalities, implicit polynomials and functions, all of which can be edited dynamically later. Elements can be entered and modified using mouse and touch controls, or through an input bar. GeoGebra can store variables for numbers, vectors and points, calculate derivatives and integrals of functions, and has a full complement of commands like Root or Extremum. Teachers and students can use GeoGebra as an aid in formulating and proving geometric conjectures.

GeoGebra's main features are:

- Interactive geometry environment (2D and 3D)
- Built-in spreadsheet
- Built-in computer algebra system (CAS)
- Built-in statistics and calculus tools
- Scripting hooks
- Large number of interactive learning and teaching resources at GeoGebra Materials.

== GeoGebra Materials platform ==
The GeoGebra Materials platform is a cloud service that allows users to upload and share GeoGebra applets with others. GeoGebra Materials was originally launched as GeoGebraTube in June 2011, and was renamed in 2016. As of April 2016 the service hosts more than 1 million resources, 400,000+ of which are public. "Materials" include interactive worksheets, simulations, games and e-books created using GeoGebraBook.

GeoGebra Materials can be also exported in several formats, including SVG, Animated GIF, Windows Metafile, PNG, PDF and EPS, as well as copied directly to the clipboard. GeoGebra can also generate code for use in LaTeX files.

== Licensing ==
Before version 4.2, GeoGebra was published under the GNU General Public License (GPL-3.0-or-later).

After version 4.2 the licensing was changed. GeoGebra's source code, except the installers, web services, user interface image and style files, and documentation and language files, is licensed under the GNU General Public License (GPL-3.0-or-later). The installers and web services are released under GeoGebra's own proprietary license. User interface image and style files, and documentation and language files are published under the Creative Commons NonCommercial license (CC BY-NC-SA 3.0). Commercial use is subject to a special license and collaboration agreement.

Since parts of GeoGebra not licensed under a GPL compatible license are required to build the program, and since GeoGebra includes GPL licensed libraries, some users, including a maintainer of one of the libraries used by GeoGebra, consider the license invalid. In response, the International GeoGebra Institute, and GeoGebra's creator, Markus Hohenwarter, have provided a license FAQ.

== Community ==
The International GeoGebra Institute (IGI) is the nonprofit arm of the GeoGebra Group. The institute coordinates research, development, translation and deployment efforts of the GeoGebra system across a global network of user groups at universities and non-profit organizations, as well as provide certification to GeoGebra experts and trainers.

== Awards ==
- Archimedes 2016: MNU Award in category Mathematics (Hamburg, Germany)
- Microsoft Partner of the Year Award 2015: Finalist, Public Sector: Education (Redmond, WA, USA)
- MERLOT Award for Exemplary Online Learning Resources – MERLOT Classics 2013 (Las Vegas, Nevada, USA)
- NTLC Award 2010: National Technology Leadership Award 2010 (Washington D.C., USA)
- Tech Award 2009: Laureate in the Education Category (San Jose, California, USA)
- BETT Award 2009: Finalist in London for British Educational Technology Award
- SourceForge.net Community Choice Awards 2008: Finalist, Best Project for Educators
- AECT Distinguished Development Award 2008: Association for Educational Communications and Technology (Orlando, USA)
- Learnie Award 2006: Austrian Educational Software Award for "Wurfbewegungen mit GeoGebra" (Vienna, Austria)
- eTwinning Award 2006: 1st prize for "Crop Circles Challenge" with GeoGebra (Linz, Austria)
- Les Trophées du Libre 2005: International Free Software Award, category Education (Soisson, France)
- Comenius 2004: German Educational Media Award (Berlin, Germany)
- Learnie Award 2005: Austrian Educational Software Award for "Spezielle Relativitätstheorie mit GeoGebra" (Vienna, Austria)
- digita 2004: German Educational Software Award (Cologne, Germany)
- Learnie Award 2003: Austrian Educational Software Award (Vienna, Austria)
- EASA 2002: European Academic Software Award (Ronneby, Sweden)

== See also ==
- C.a.R.
- Computer-based mathematics education
- Desmos
- DrGeo
- Kig
- Mathematical software
- Xcas
