= GEUP =

Geometry software

GEUP 12
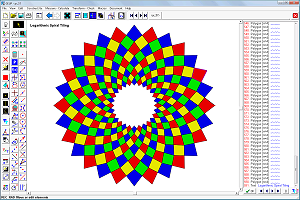
- GEUP 12
- Developer: GEUP.net
- Stable release: 12.0.1 / September 2025
- Operating system: Windows
- Type: Mathematical software
- License: Proprietary
- Website: Official website

GEUP is a commercial interactive geometry software program on windows, similar to Cabri Geometry. Originally using the Spanish language, it was programmed by Ramón Alvarez Galván. Recent versions include support for three-dimensional geometry.
