= KSEG =

KSEG may refer to:

- KSEG (FM), a radio station (96.9 FM) licensed to Sacramento, California, United States
- KSEG (software), a geometry software
- Penn Valley Airport's ICAO code
