= Minuit =

Minuit (meaning "midnight" in French) may refer to:

- MINUIT, a numerical minimization program created at CERN
- Minuit (band), an electronic band from New Zealand
- Peter Minuit (between 1580 and 1585 – 1638), Dutch settler known for purchasing Manhattan in 1626
- Les Éditions de Minuit, French publishing house
- Minuit (Op. 168), a polka by Émile Waldteufel
