= Desmos =

Browser-based graphing calculator

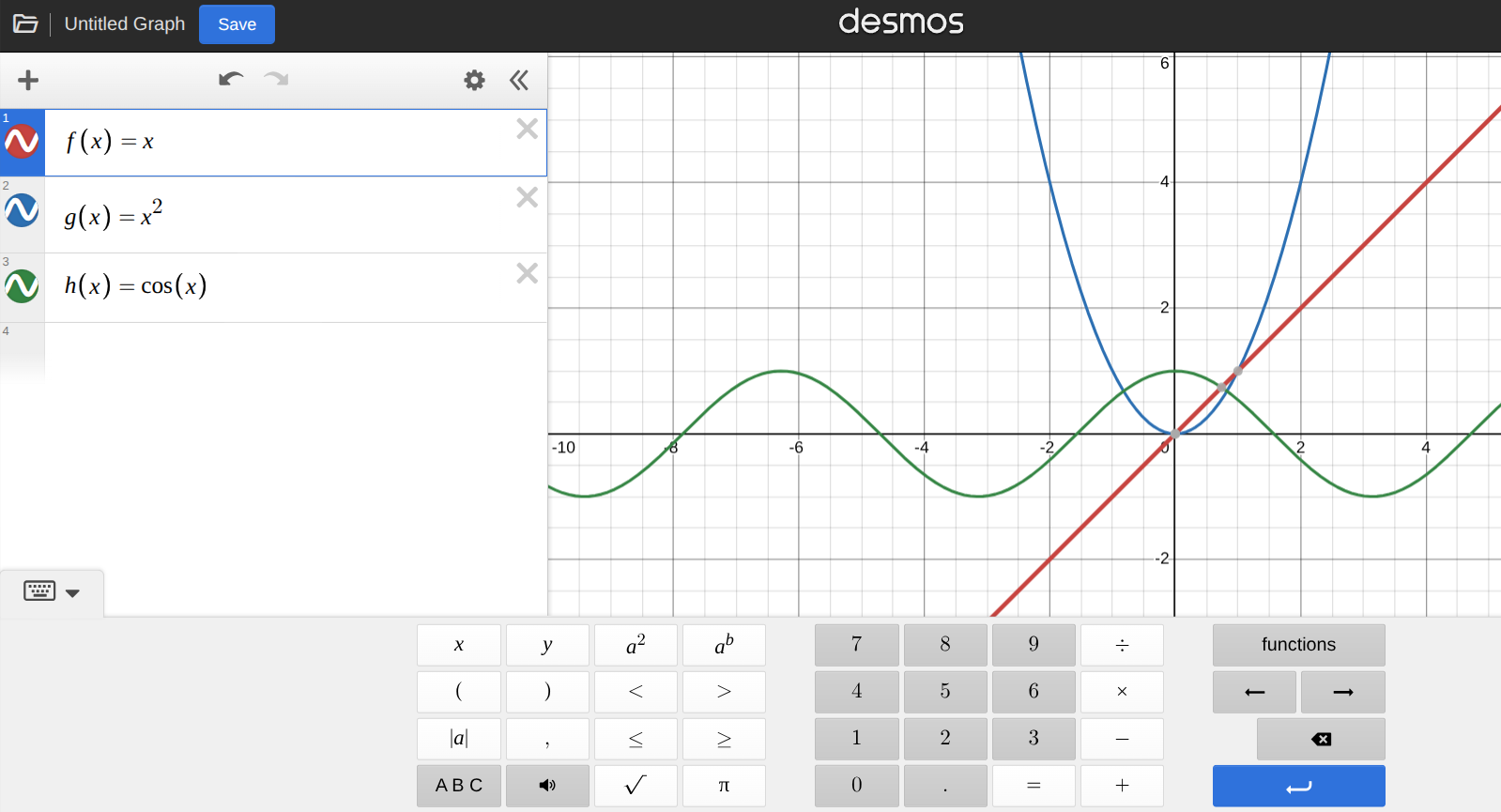
- Website type: Online graphing calculator
- Owner: Desmos Studio PBC
- Website: www.desmos.com
- Registration: Optional
- Launched: 2011; 15 years ago
- Current status: Online
- Written in: TypeScript, JavaScript, HTML, and CSS

Desmos is an advanced graphing calculator implemented as a web application and a mobile application written in TypeScript and JavaScript.

== History ==
Desmos was founded by Eli Luberoff, a math and physics double major from Yale University, and was launched as a startup at the TechCrunch Disrupt New York conference in 2011. As of September 2012, it had received around 1 million US dollars of funding from Kapor Capital, Learn Capital, Kindler Capital, Elm Street Ventures and Google Ventures.

The name Dsimos came from the Greek word δεσμός which means a bond or a tie; it was chosen through a naming Contest among the CEO's friends and family.

In May 2022, Amplify acquired the Desmos curriculum and teacher.desmos.com. Some 50 employees joined Amplify. Desmos Studio was spun off as a separate public benefit corporation focused on building calculator products and other math tools.

In May 2023, Desmos released a beta for a remade Geometry Tool. In it, geometrical shapes can be made, as well as expressions from the normal graphing calculator, with extra features. In September 2023, Desmos released a beta for a 3D calculator, which added features on top of the 2D calculator, including cross products, partial derivatives and double-variable parametric equations.

== Features ==
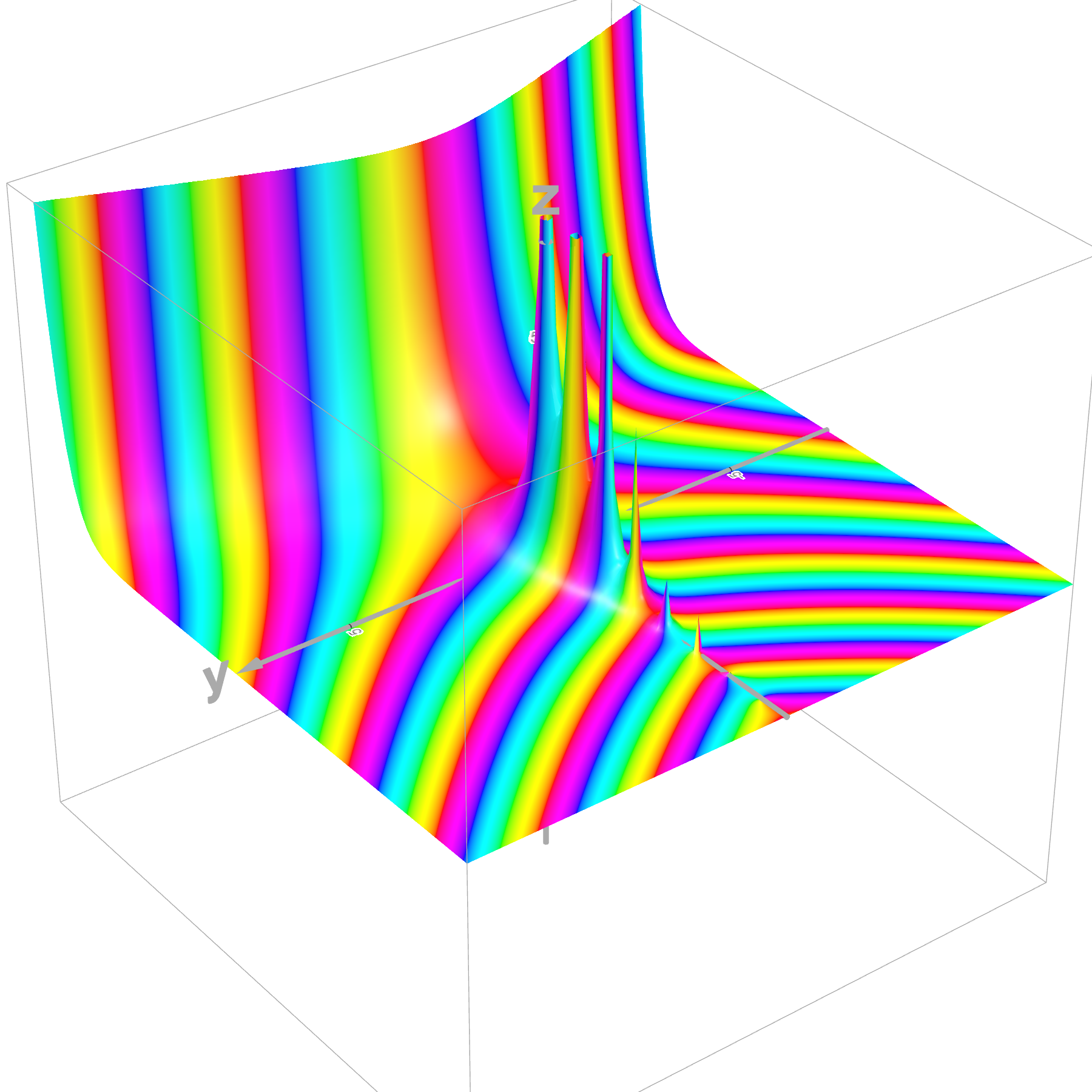
Γ(z) in the complex plane made with Desmos 3D

In addition to graphing both equations and inequalities, it features lists, plots, regressions, interactive variables, graph restriction, simultaneous graphing, piecewise function graphing, recursive function graphing, polar function graphing, two types of graphing grids – among other computational features commonly found in a programmable calculator. It can also be used in several languages. Calculus operations such as derivatives and integrals are also available, although direct limits and infinite summations are currently absent. Integrations to positive and negative infinity are supported, and series can also be raised to sufficiently high iterations. Other functions like trigonometric and other transcendental functions, as well as the error function, factorial, statistical operations such as the normal distribution, chi-squared, the aforementioned regressions, the random function, and recursive functions have also been introduced since 2020. In November 2023, Desmos gave users the ability to bring sound to their graphs, allowing them to produce tones of a given frequency and gain.

Users can create accounts and save the graphs and plots that they have created to them. A permalink can then be generated which allows users to share their graphs and elect to be considered for staff picks. The tool comes pre-programmed with 70 different example graphs for the purpose of teaching new users about the tool and the mathematics involved.

As of April 2017, Desmos also released a browser-based 2D interactive geometry tool, with supporting features including the plotting of points, lines, circles, and polygons. In May 2023, Desmos released a beta version of a second, more sophisticated geometry calculator.

Another popular use of the calculator involves the creation of graphic arts using equations, polygons, and inequalities. Many artworks also employ sliders, which help create motion and dynamic graphs. Some of these projects have included features such as 3D via parameterization, and with the use of RGB and HSV colouring introduced in late 2020, artwork with custom colouring, as well as the domain colouring of complex functions. Introduced in late 2021, tickers (among the greater "Actions" feature) let the users automatically and continuously execute actions at defined intervals, allowing the creation of simulations and games on the graphing calculator. With new performance updates, graphs that include the Mandelbrot set and the Ducks fractal can be made on Desmos. Features such as simulations and tickers also allowed users to create functional interactive games. The usage of these features can be found in Desmos's annual art contest.

Desmos also offers other services: the Scientific Calculator, Four Function Calculator, Notebook, Matrix Calculator, Geometry Tool, Geometry Calculator, 3D Graphing Calculator, Desmos Test Mode and Desmos Notebook.

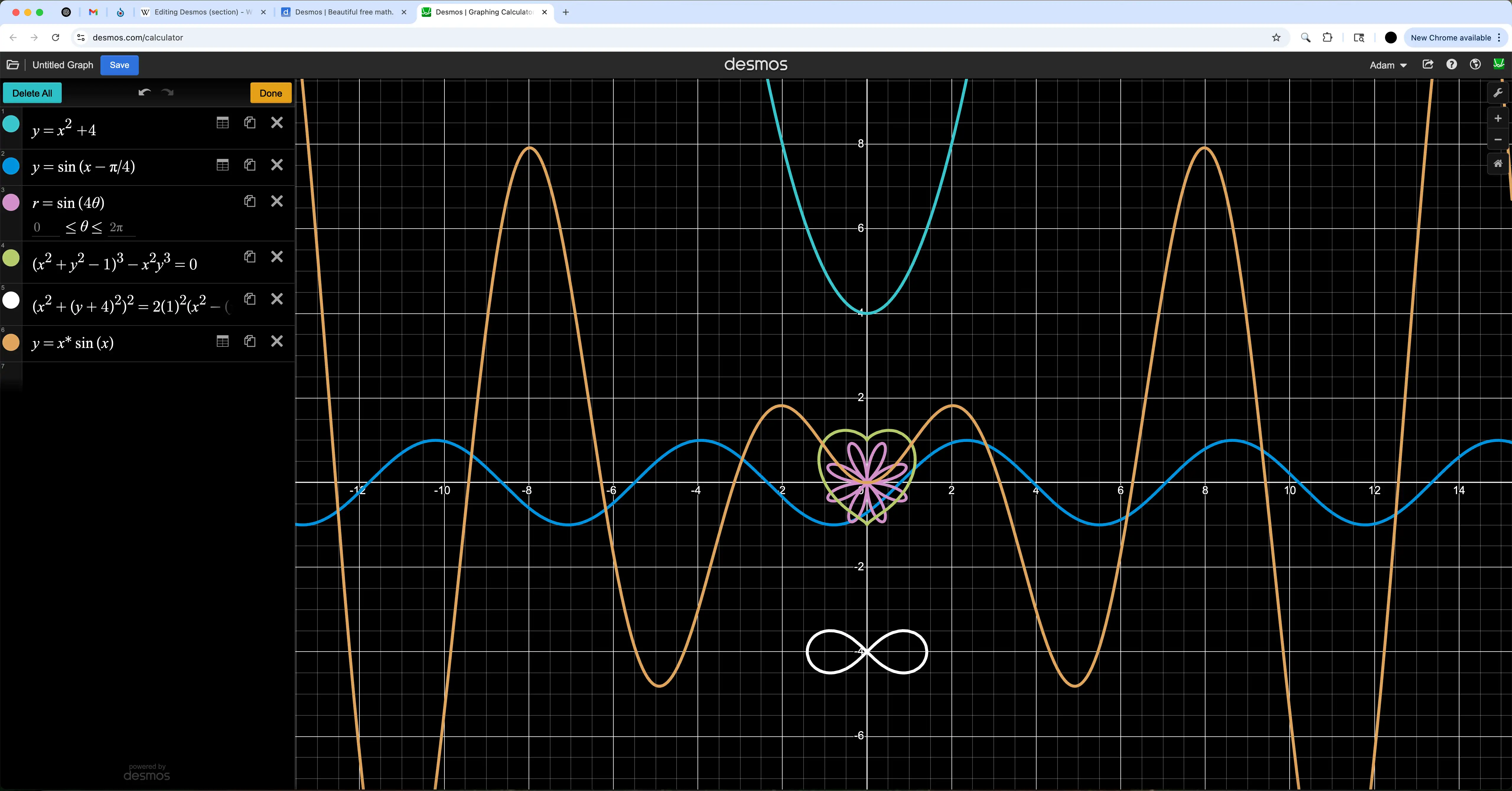
Graphing Calculator

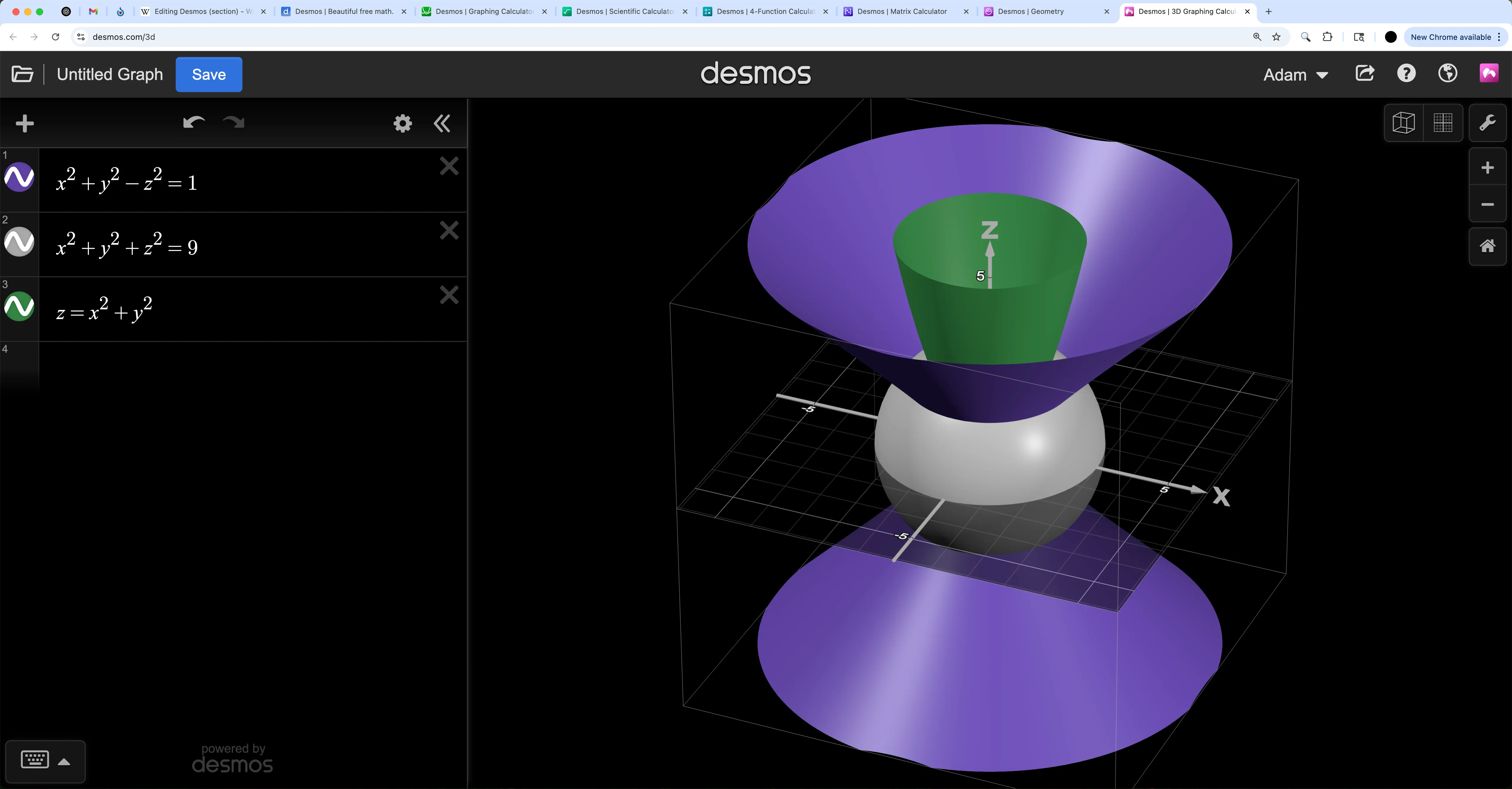
3D Graphing Calculator

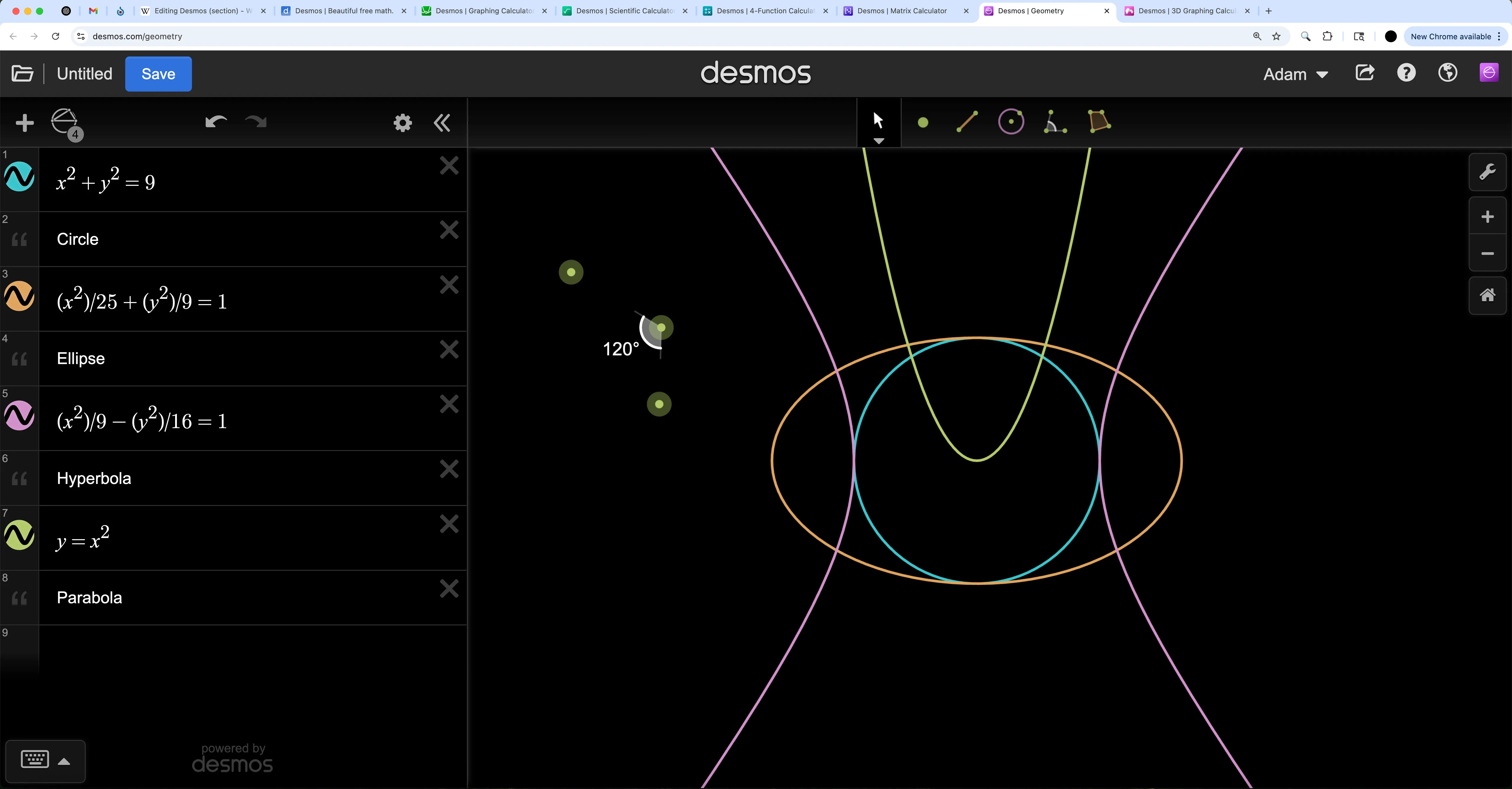
Geometry Tool

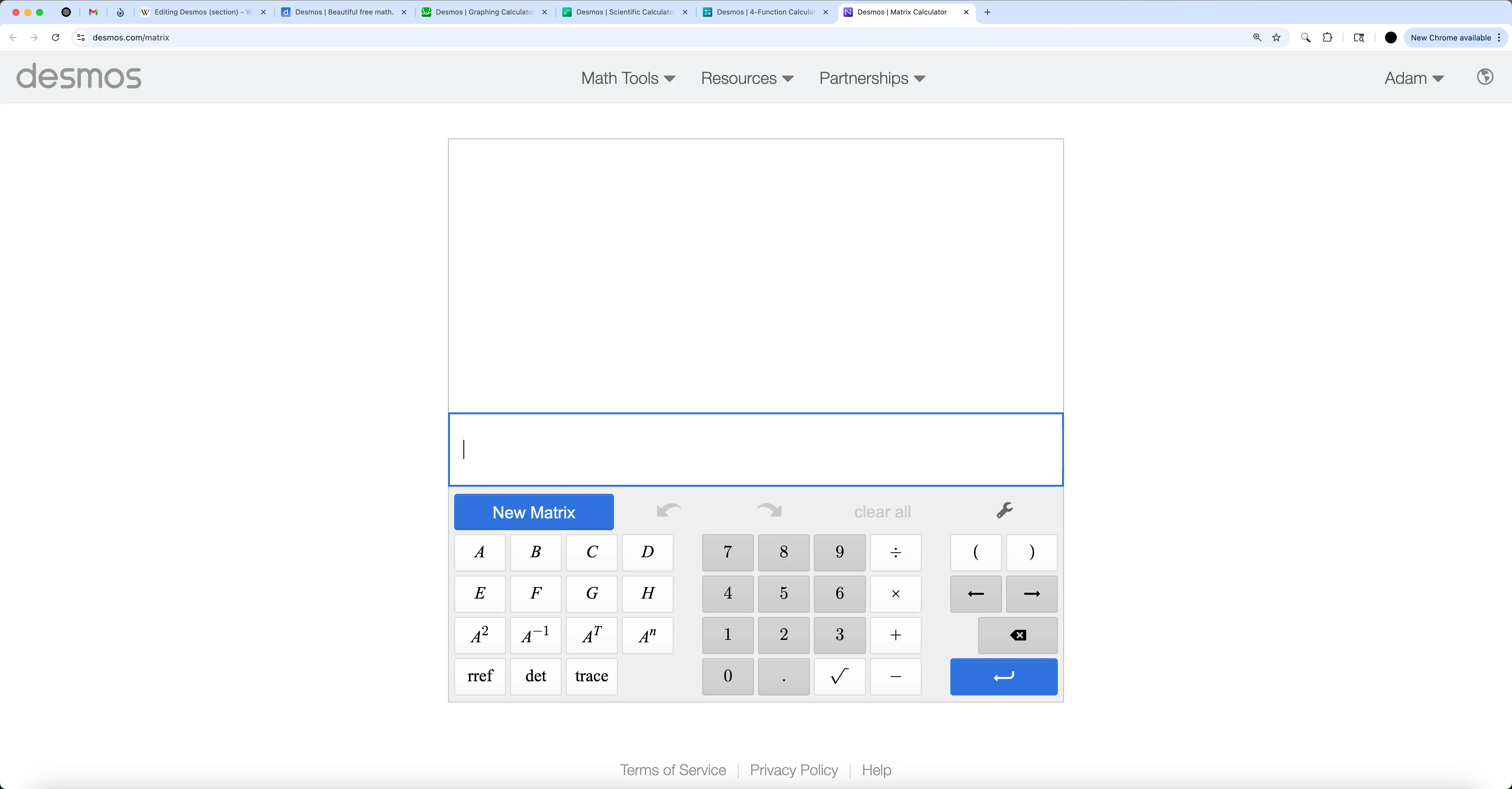
Matrix Calculator

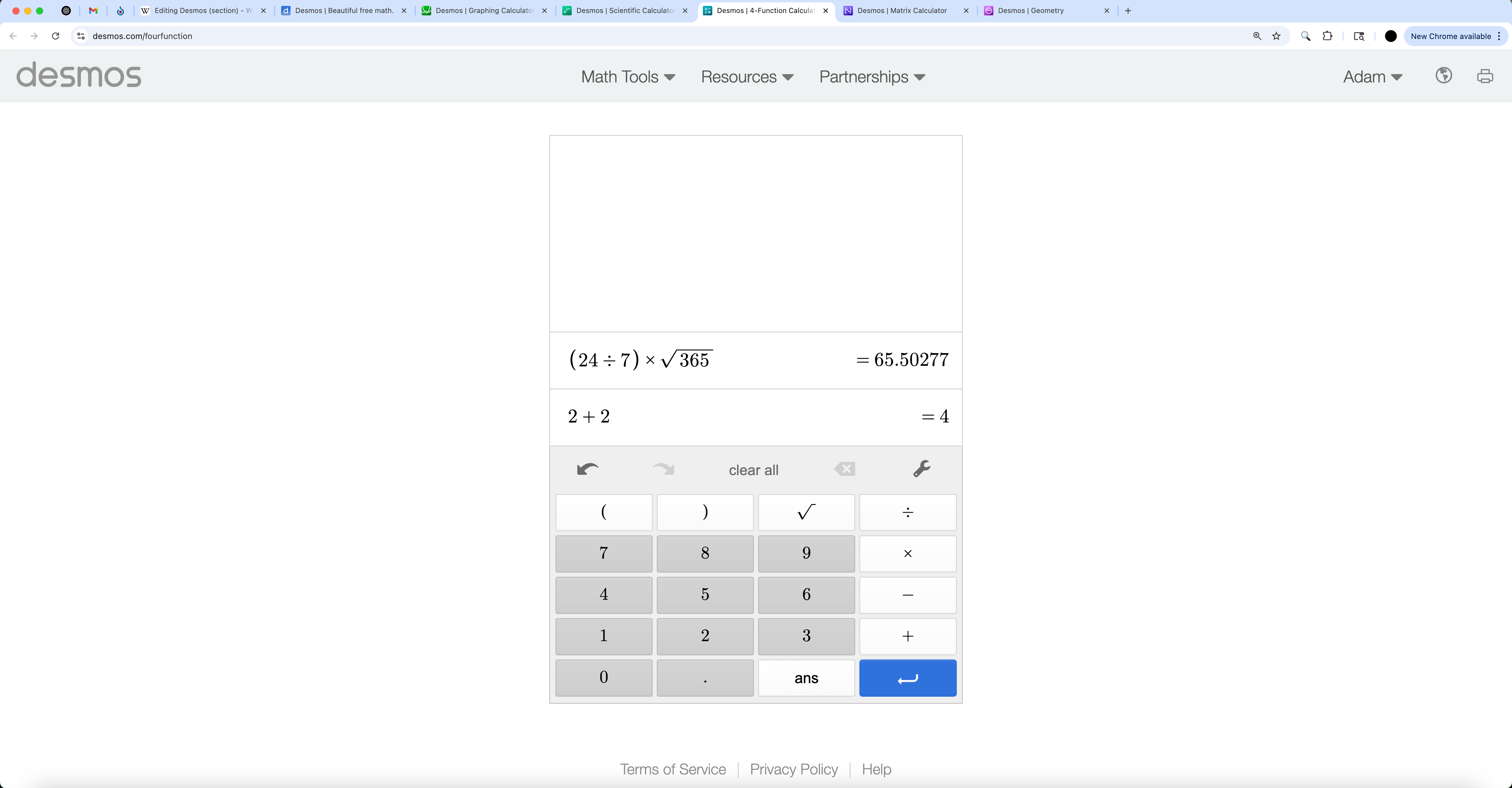
4-Function Calculator

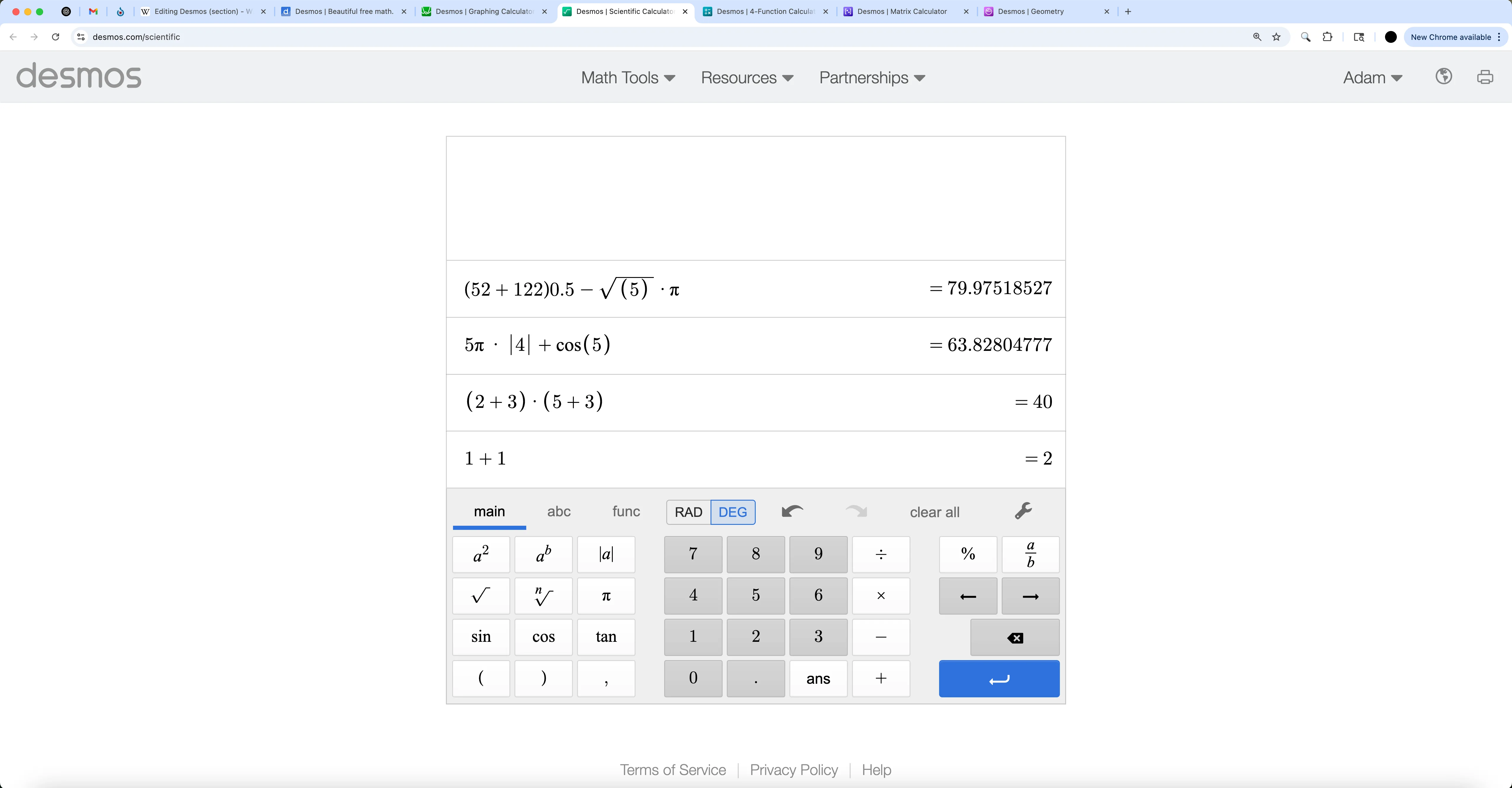
Scientific Calculator

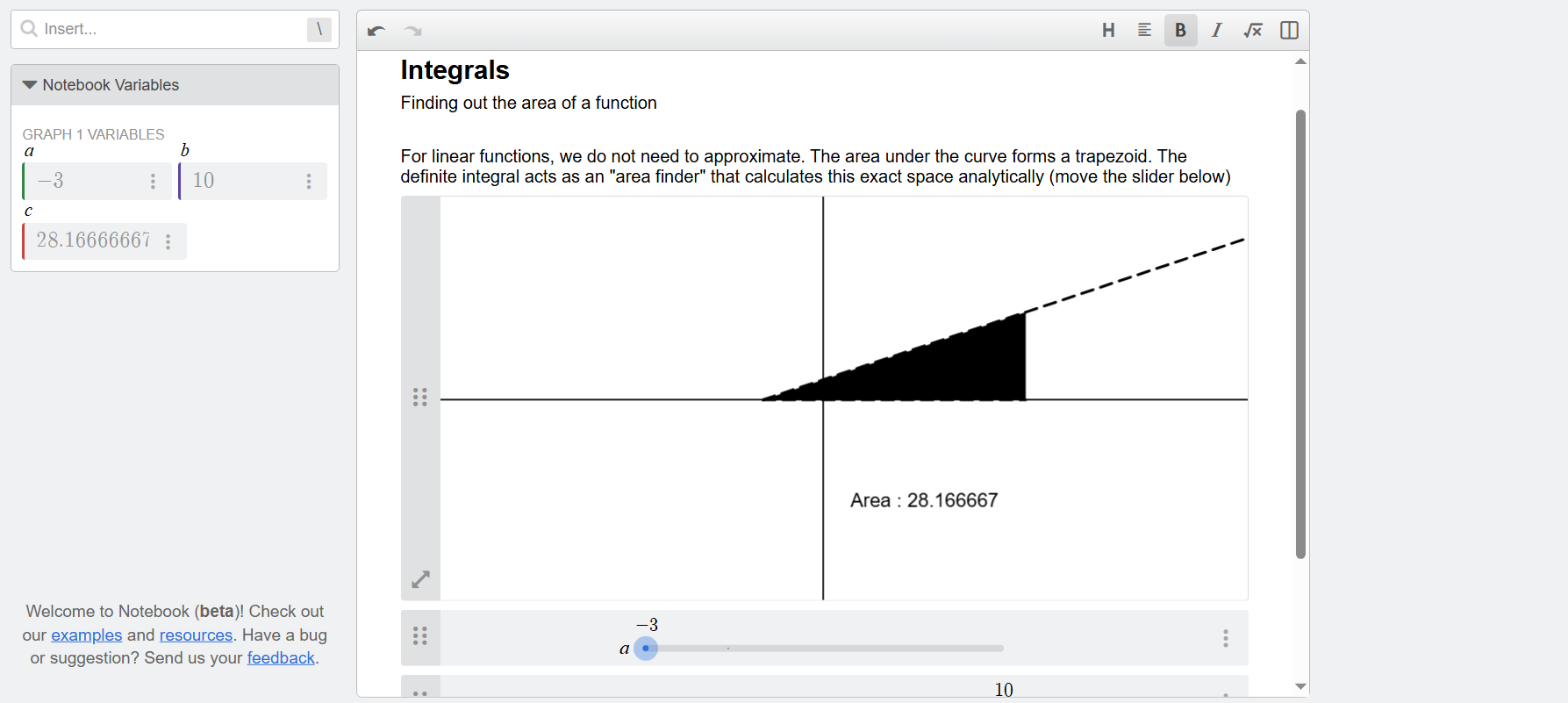
Desmos Notebook

== Applications ==
A modified version of the calculator has been used in standardized tests, such as the State of Texas Assessments of Academic Readiness test, the Virginia Standards of Learning (SOL), the California Assessment of Student Performance and Progress (CAASPP), the SAT, and specific AP Exams. Activity modules for classrooms can be created through a teacher account, which allow instructors to view students' work and response in real-time.

Its business model involves paid partnerships with publishers, assessment companies, and educational institutions.

The calculator and graphing features can also be found on AssessPrep, an examination site used by many schools following the IB Curriculum.

== See also ==
- GeoGebra
- Lists of mathematical software
- List of open-source software for mathematics
- Wolfram Alpha
- Grapher
