= KSEG (software) =

Geometry software

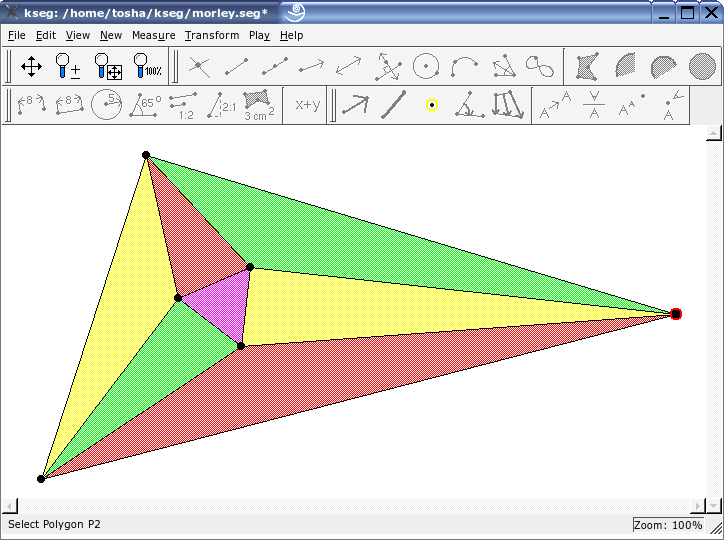
- KSEG
- Developer: Ilya Baran
- Final release: 0.403 / 13 February 2006; 20 years ago
- Written in: C++
- Platform: KDE 3 / Qt 3
- Type: Interactive geometry software
- License: GPL
- Website: www.mit.edu/~ibaran/kseg.html Archived
- Repository: none

KSEG is a free (GPL) interactive geometry software for exploring Euclidean geometry. It was created by Ilya Baran. It runs on Unix-based platforms. It also compiles and runs on Mac OS X and should run on anything that Qt supports. Additionally, it was also ported to Microsoft Windows.

KSEG is a tool designed to let you easily visualize dynamic properties of compass and straightedge construction and to make geometric exploration as fast and easy as possible. KSEG was inspired by the Geometer's Sketchpad, but it goes beyond the functionality that Sketchpad provides. KSEG can be used in the classroom, for personal exploration of geometry, or for making high-quality figures for LaTeX.

== See also ==
- Kig – KDE 4 / Qt 4 geometry software
