= C.a.R. =

Interactive geometry app

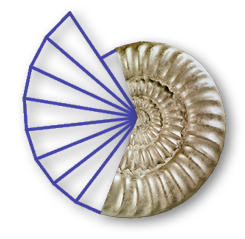

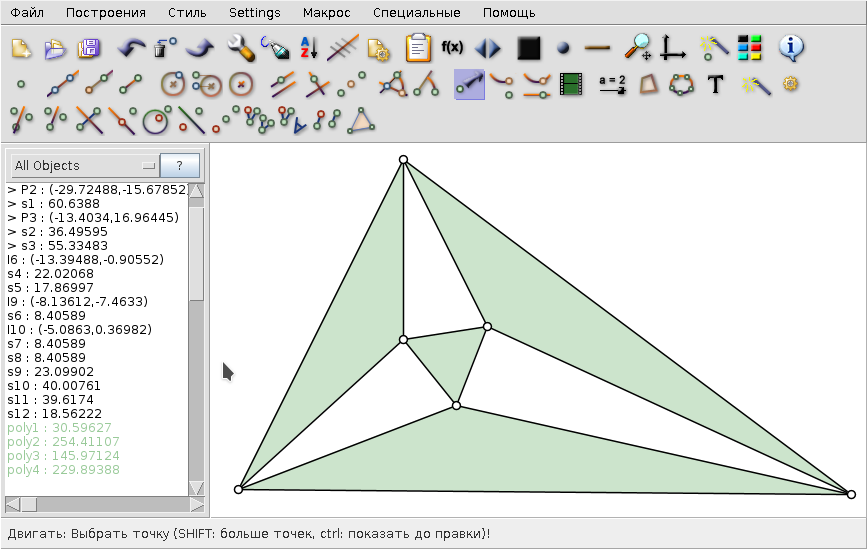
- Original author: René Grothmann
- Initial release: January 1, 1996
- Stable release: 20.0 / March 21, 2022; 3 years ago
- Written in: Java
- Operating system: Linux, Microsoft Windows, Mac OS X
- Type: Interactive geometry software
- License: GNU General Public License
- Website: car.rene-grothmann.de/doc_en/index.html

C.a.R. (Compass and Ruler), also known as Z.u.L. (Zirkel und Lineal), is a free and open source interactive geometry app that can do geometrical constructions in Euclidean and non-Euclidean geometry. The software is Java based. The author is René Grothmann of the Catholic University of Eichstätt-Ingolstadt. It is licensed under the terms of the GNU General Public License (GPL).

== Assignments ==
Assignments make possible to create Java applets, for a construction exercises. These applets can be used from the command line using the AppletViewer. (Previously, they could be run in a browser, but Java support in browsers has been disabled in recent years.)

== See also ==
- GeoGebra
- CaRMetal
- Compass-and-straightedge construction
