= OpenPlaG =

openPlaG
- Release: July 1, 2007; 19 years ago
- Stable release: 5.2 / 15 November 2026; 0 days ago
- Written in: JavaScript
- Operating system: Cross-platform
- Available in: English, German
- Type: function graph plotter
- License: GPL v3
- Website: rechneronline.de/openPlaG

openPlaG is a JavaScript based function graph plotter for the use in a web browser. Until version 4.2, it was PHP based. The plotter was first made available online in April 2006. In June 2007 its source code was published under the GNU GPL license, introducing the name openPlaG. PlaG is an abbreviation for Plot a Graph.

The current version 5.2 of openPlaG allows the display of up to three function graphs, their derivative and their integral and some ordinary differential equations. It can compute several different functions, with a focus on a large function variety and on probability functions. Settings for a graph can be saved and loaded. A substitution for a user-defined formula can be used. It has an instruction page, which explains the use of the plotter and the function syntax.

About 150 functions are predefined. These belong to the categories basic functions, trigonometric and hyperbolic functions, non-differentiable functions, probability functions, special functions, programmable functions, iterations and fractals.

The plotter has been included in the OER Atlas 2016, a survey of open educational resources in Germany, Austria and Switzerland.

== See also ==
List of information graphics software
