= Gareth Loy =

American classical composer

Gareth Loy (June 20, 1945 – May 28, 2026) was an American author, composer, musician and mathematician. He is the author of the two volume series about the intersection of music and mathematics titled Musimathics. The series received generally favourable ratings. He was an early practitioner of music synthesis at Stanford, and wrote the first software compiler for the Systems Concepts Digital Synthesizer (Samson Box). More recently, he has published the freeware music programming language Musimat, designed specifically for subjects covered in Musimathics, available as a free download. Although Musimathics was first published in 2006 and 2007, the series continues to evolve with updates by the author and publishers. The texts are being used in numerous mathematics and music classes at both the graduate and undergraduate level, with more current reviews noting that the originally targeted academic distribution is now reaching a much wider audience.

== Biographical background ==
Loy was born in Los Angeles in 1945. He was an early employee at Apple Computer, and is the brother of the late Tom Loy, a molecular archaeologist, and member of the team that researched Oetzi the Iceman.

In the 1960s and 1970s, CCRMA – the Center for Research in Music and Acoustics at Stanford University – which was then a research project at the Stanford Artificial Intelligence Laboratory (SAIL), developed fundamental technologies later used extensively in the digital synthesizer and digital audio industries. Loy was a grad student at CCRMA in the mid-70s, and wrote the compiler software for the original Samson Box, which was the original and most powerful and complex digital synthesizer/processor of the day. Loy also composed Nekyia, a dynamic and powerful four channel composition, to fully demonstrate the capabilities of the Samson Box. Loy received his B.A. from San Francisco State University in 1975 and his DMA (Doctor of Musical Arts) from Stanford's Artificial Intelligence Laboratory and CCRMA, in Computer Science, Signal Processing and Digital Music Composition in 1980. Gareth lives with his wife Lisa in San Rafael, California.

== Composer and performer ==
Loy has been a long-time member of the Flying Without Instruments band, which has performed internationally, including compositions by Loy. Loy's composition Blood From a Stone (1992) was written for an electronic violin designed by Max Mathews and performed by Negyesy. Gareth also performs in the Tenaya Classical Guitar Duo, and founded the San Francisco performance art group "Hermes," which performed live concerts of abstract electronic music with liquid light projections for 5 years in the early 1970s.

== Publications ==
1. Loy, Gareth, Musimathics — The Mathematical Foundations of Music, Vol. 2, Cambridge: MIT Press. 2007.
2. Loy, Gareth, Musimathics — The Mathematical Foundations of Music, Vol. 1, Cambridge: MIT Press. 2006.
3. Loy, Gareth, “The CARL System: Premises, History, and Fate,” Computer Music Journal 26(4), Winter 2002.
4. Loy, Gareth, “The Frox Digital Audio System,” Proceedings of the International Computer Music Conference (San Jose), San Francisco: International Computer Music Association, 1992.
5. Todd, P. and Loy, Gareth, eds., Music and Connectionism, Cambridge: MIT Press, 1991.
6. Loy, Gareth, “Composing with computers — a survey of some compositional formalisms and programming languages for music,” Current Directions in Computer Music, Max Mathews, John Pierce, eds., Cambridge: MIT Press, 1990.
7. Loy, Gareth, “On the scheduling of parallel processors executing synchronously,” Proceedings of the International Computer Music Conference, San Francisco: International Computer Music Association, 1987.
8. Loy, Gareth, “Whither MIDI,” Computer Music Journal, 11(1): 9–12, 1987.
9. Loy, Gareth, “Designing a computer music workstation from musical imperatives,” Proceedings of the International Computer Music Conference, San Francisco: International Computer Music Association, 1986.
10. Loy, Gareth, “Player — an experimental music composition language with real-time capabilities,” Technical Memorandum, UCSD: Center for Music Experiment, 1986.
11. Loy, Gareth and Abbott, Curtis, “Programming languages for computer music synthesis, performance, and composition,” ACM Computing Surveys, 17(2), June, 1985.
12. Loy, Gareth, “Programming languages for computer music synthesis, performance, and composition,” ACM Computing Surveys, 17(2), June, 1985. Also published in Japanese by the ACM Computing Surveys in Bit.
13. Loy, Gareth, “About AUDIUM: an interview with Stanley Shaff,” Computer Music Journal, 9(2): 41–48, 1985.
14. Loy, Gareth, “Musicians make a standard: the MIDI phenomenon,” Computer Music Journal, 9(4): 8–26, 1985.
15. Loy, Gareth, “Curtis Roads and John Strawn, editors: Foundations of computer music,” Computer Music Journal, 9(3): 80–81, 1985.
16. Loy, Gareth, “Designing an operating environment for a real-time performance processing system,” Proceedings of the International Computer Music Conference (Vancouver), San Francisco: International Computer Music Association, 1985.
17. Loy, Gareth, “MIDI: a critical overview,” Acoustical Society of America, Invited paper for Musical Acoustics III: Real-Time Music Synthesizers, Abst.: JASA Suppl. 77(1): S74, 1985.
18. Loy, Gareth, “Computer music research using SUN workstations at the Computer Audio Research Laboratory,” SUN Users Group Los Angeles, SUN Users Group, Palo Alto, CA, 1985.
19. Loy, Gareth, “Player — extensions to the C programming language for parallel processing run-time music synthesis control,” Proceedings, MIDISOFT, San Francisco, 1984.
20. Loy, Gareth, “Allen Strange: Electronic music — systems, techniques, and controls, 2nd edition,” Computer Music Journal, 7(4): 60–61, 1983.
21. Loy, Gareth, “An experimental music composition language with real-time capabilities,” Proceedings of the International Computer Music Conference (Rochester), San Francisco: International Computer Music Association, 1983.
22. Loy, Gareth, “Applications of digital signal processing in computer music,” Acoustical Society of America, Invited paper, Special Plenary Session: Applications of Signal Processing in Acoustics, Abst., JASA Suppl., 74(1): S36, 1983.
23. Loy, Gareth, “The composer seduced into programming,” Perspectives of New Music, 19(1): 184–198, 1982.
24. Loy, Gareth, “A sound file system for UNIX,” Proceedings of the International Computer Music Conference (Venice, Italy), San Francisco: International Computer Music Association, 1982.
25. Loy, Gareth, “System design for computer music at the Computer Audio Research Laboratory, UCSD,” IEEE 1982 Region VI Conference, Invited paper for the session on Computer Systems and Applications, San Diego, 1982.
26. Loy, Gareth, “Notes on the implementation of MUSBOX, a compiler for the Systems Concepts Digital Synthesizer,” Computer Music Journal, 5(1): 13–33, 1981.
27. Loy, Gareth, Nekyia, Stanford University Department of Music DMA thesis, Ann Arbor, Michigan: University Microfilms, 1980.
28. Loy, Gareth, “Systems Concepts Digital Synthesizer operations manual and tutorial,” Stanford University Report STAN-M-6, Stanford University: Department of Music, 1980.
29. Loy, Gareth, “Sonic landscapes, electronic and computer music by Barry Truax, and Studies for trumpet and computer by Dexter Morrill,” Computer Music Journal, 2(1): 60–61, 1978.
30. Loy, Gareth, “New directions in music — Significant contemporary works for the computer,” Computer Music Journal, 2(4): 6–8, 1978.
31. Loy, Gareth, “The Dartmouth digital synthesizer, electronic music by Jon Appleton, Lars-Gunnar Bodin, Russell Pinkston & William Brunson,” Computer Music Journal, 1(2): 61, 1977.
32. Loy, Gareth, “Studio report, CCRMA, Stanford University,” Proceedings of the International Computer Music Conference (UCSD), San Francisco: International Computer Music Association, 1977.
33. Loy, Gareth, “The all-digital recording studio at Stanford University,” Proceedings of the International Computer Music Conference (MIT), San Francisco: International Computer Music Association, 1975.

== Awards ==
- Fellow, Deutscher Akademischer Austauschdienst (DAAD), Berliner Kunstlerprogramm, Berlin (1986)
- Bourges Prize, Digital Electroacoustic Music category (1981)
- National Endowment for the Arts (1981)
- Bourges Electroacoustic Music Prize (Nekyia, 1980)
