= Archimedes Geo3D =

Archimedes Geo3D is a software package for dynamic geometry in three dimensions. It was released in Germany in March 2006 and won a German government award for outstanding educational software in 2007 .

A locus surface constructed with Archimedes Geo3D

== Advanced features ==
Archimedes Geo3D can trace the movement of points, lines, segments, and circles and generate locus lines and surfaces. Arbitrary objects can be intersected with lines, locus lines, and planes.
