= TracenPoche =

European geometry software

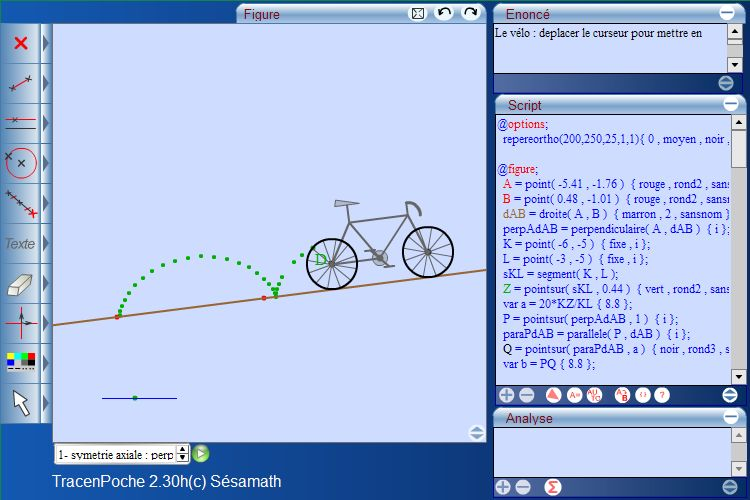
A screenshot of the TracenPocheFigure software interface.

TracenPoche (TeP) is a free interactive geometry software, written in Adobe Flash language. It is very light weight.

== Features ==
It is widely used in French secondary schools in the framework of the fr:MathenPoche exerciser suite developed by the French association of mathematics teachers fr:Sésamath.
