= The Geometer's Sketchpad =

Commercial interactive geometry software

- Sketchpad 5
- Developer: KCP Technologies
- Stable release: 5.06 / April 26, 2013
- Operating system: Mac OS X, Windows, Linux (under Wine)
- Type: Interactive geometry software
- License: Proprietary
- Website: www.dynamicgeometry.com

The Geometer's Sketchpad is a commercial interactive geometry software program for exploring Euclidean geometry, algebra, calculus, and other areas of mathematics. It was created as part of the NSF-funded Visual Geometry Project led by Eugene Klotz and Doris Schattschneider from 1986 to 1991 at Swarthmore College. Nicholas Jackiw, a student at the time, was the original designer and programmer of the software, and inventor of its trademarked "Dynamic Geometry" approach; he later moved to Key Curriculum Press and KCP Technologies to continue ongoing design and implementation of the software over multiple major releases and hardware platforms. Aside from Mac and Windows, it also runs on Linux under Wine with a few bugs. There was also a version developed for the TI-89 and TI-92 series of Calculators. In June 2019, McGraw-Hill announced that it would no longer sell new licenses. Nonetheless, a free field-test edition of Sketchpad is available for Mac and Windows. The YouTube Sketchpad Repository contains over 250 videos, with Sketchpad and Web Sketchpad tutorials as well as an archive of Sketchpad webinars that were offered by Key Curriculum Press.

== Features ==
The Geometer's Sketchpad includes the traditional Euclidean tools of classical geometric constructions. It also can perform transformations (translations, rotations, reflections, dilations) of geometric figures drawn or constructed on screen. It is far more than a construction or transformation tool, however. It can manipulate constructed objects "dynamically" by stretching or dragging while maintaining all constraints of the construction so that a seemingly infinite number of cases of a constructed figure can be viewed. Thus it is a natural tool for making or testing conjectures about geometric figures. Its accurate drawings of geometric figures make it a useful tool for illustrating mathematical articles for publication. If a figure (such as the pentadecagon) can be constructed with the compass and straightedge method, it can also be constructed in the program. The program allows "cheat" transformations to create figures impossible to construct under the compass and straightedge rules (such as the regular nonagon). Objects can be animated.

The program allows the creation of numerous objects which can be measured, and potentially used to solve hard math problems. The program allows the determination of the midpoints and midsegments of objects. The Geometer's Sketchpad can measure lengths of segments, measures of angles, area, perimeter, etc. Some of the tools include a construct function, which allows the user to create objects in relation to selected objects. The transform function allows the user to create points in relation to objects, which include distance, angle, ratio, and others.

== Web Sketchpad ==
Built on the foundation of The Geometer's Sketchpad, Web Sketchpad (WSP) began as part of the NSF DRK-12 funded Dynamic Number project. WSP removes distracting interfaces—it has no menus, displays no dialog boxes, and does not require users to "select" objects to apply commands to them. Three noteworthy characteristics of Web Sketchpad's tools are the following:

Ease of Use: Every WSP tool operates the same way: The student taps a tool and the complete product appears immediately (providing the student with a graphic description of the result of the tool) with one of the product’s mathematical elements glowing (prompting the student either to place that glowing element or to match it to some part of an existing construction). No objects need to be selected in advance, and no prompts are needed to tell the student how to use the tool. For instance, tapping the Segment tool displays a segment with one endpoint glowing, and the student can tap or drag to place that endpoint in empty space, on an existing point, or on some other existing object (such as a segment, ray, line, circle, polygon, or graph).

At the same time as the student taps the tool, additional scaffolding appears immediately, in the Help Bar beneath the sketch. This scaffolding includes a short text description of the construction and two video buttons, one displaying a short silent hint video of less than 30 seconds and the other displaying a more detailed video that shows several ways to use the tool. Both videos display captions, and the second also has narration, initially muted to avoid unwanted sound in a classroom setting.

Targeted Tools: Activities include only those tools necessary for the task at hand, reducing software complexity. A focused set of tools also the activity designer to create instrumented fields of promoted action where the presence of particular tools encourages teachers and students to adopt these tools as frames of action and reference, channeling them to think about problems in ways they otherwise might not.

Customizable Tools: The set of WSP tools is theoretically unlimited. A teacher can craft new tools based on the mathematical and pedagogical needs of a lesson without the traditional limits of a fixed set of generic tools.

== See also ==
- List of interactive geometry software
- Lénárt sphere
