= Cinderella (software) =

The Interactive Geometry Software Cinderella
- Original author(s): Jürgen Richter-Gebert and Ulrich Kortenkamp
- Initial release: 1998
- Stable release: Cinderella 2.9 build 1835 / March 6, 2016; 9 years ago
- Preview release: Cinderella 2.9 build 1901 / June 12, 2017; 7 years ago
- Written in: Java
- Operating system: Windows, Mac OS, Linux, Solaris
- Platform: Java
- Available in: 7 languages
- List of languages English, German, Japanese, French, Spanish, Italian, Portuguese
- Type: Interactive geometry software
- License: Proprietary
- Website: cinderella.de/tiki-index.php

Cinderella is a proprietary interactive geometry software, written in Java.

== History ==
Cinderella was initially developed by Jürgen Richter-Gebert and Henry Crapo and was used to input incidence theorems and conjectures for automatic theorem proving using the binomial proving method by Richter-Gebert. The initial software was created in Objective-C on the NeXT platform.

In 1996, the software was rewritten in Java from scratch by Jürgen Richter-Gebert and Ulrich Kortenkamp. It still included the binomial prover, but was not suitable for classroom teaching as it still was prototypical. This version won the Multimedia Innovation Award at Learntec '97 in Karlsruhe, Germany. Due to this attention the German educational software publisher Heureka-Klett and the scientific publisher Springer-Verlag, Heidelberg, agreed to produce a commercial version of the software. The school version of Cinderella 1.0 was published in 1998, including about 150 examples, animations and exercises created with Cinderella, the university version was released in 1999.

In 2006, a new version of Cinderella, Cinderella.2, was published in an online-only version. The printed manual for the now current version 2.6 was published by Springer-Verlag in 2012.

In 2013, the pro version of Cinderella was made freely available.

== Features ==
Interactive geometry and analysis takes place in the realm of euclidean geometry, spherical geometry or hyperbolic geometry. It includes a physics simulation engine (with real gravity on Apple computers) and a scripting language. An export to blog feature allows for a 1-click publication on the web of a figure. It is currently mainly used in universities in Germany but its ease of use makes it suitable for usage at primary and secondary level as well.
