= Geometry Expert =

Geometry Expert (GEX) is a Chinese software package for dynamic diagram drawing and automated geometry theorem proving and discovering.

There's a new Chinese version of Geometry Expert, called MMP/Geometer.

Java Geometry Expert is free under GNU General Public License.
