= WIRIS =

Software company specializing in STEM writing and assessment tools

- Industry: Educational technology, Software, STEM, publishing
- Founded: 1999
- Headquarters: Barcelona, Spain
- Area served: Worldwide
- Products: MathType, WirisQuizzes, LearningLemur.
- Services: STEM writing tools, math editing, online assessment, symbolic computation
- Website: www.wiris.com

WIRIS (legally Maths for More, S.L.U.) is a software company based in Barcelona, Spain, that develops tools for editing, displaying, and assessing mathematical and scientific notation in digital environments. Its products are used in education, digital publishing, and online assessment, and integrate with learning management systems, office suites, and web applications. WIRIS is the current developer of the equation editor MathType.

== History ==
WIRIS originated in 1999 as a university project at the Technical University of Catalonia (UPC), created by a group of mathematics students and a professor. The company was subsequently established under the name Maths for More and focused on web-based mathematics software.

- In 2002, WIRIS released WIRIS CAS (currently named CalcMe), a browser-based computer algebra system.
- In 2007, the company launched WIRIS Editor, a WYSIWYG math editor supporting MathML and LaTeX, initially distributed for the Moodle platform.
- In 2009, WIRIS introduced WIRIS Quizzes, an online assessment tool for creating and automatically grading mathematics and science exercises.
- In 2015, handwriting recognition for mathematical and chemical notation was added to the WIRIS editing tools.
- In 2017, WIRIS acquired Design Science, Inc., the original developers of MathType, expanding its presence in scientific publishing and desktop-office environments.
- From 2018 onward, the company released cloud-based versions of MathType and expanded support for learning management systems platforms and Google Workspace.
- In 2023, WIRIS launched LearningLemur, a math practice tool integrated with Google Classroom.

== Products ==
=== MathType ===
MathType is an equation editor used to create mathematical and scientific notation for documents, web content, and learning platforms. Originally developed by Design Science and acquired by WIRIS in 2017, MathType supports both visual WYSIWYG editing and LaTeX input. It integrates with productivity suites such as Microsoft Office and Google Workspace, as well as learning management systems platforms including Moodle, Canvas, Schoology, and Blackboard. MathType enables users to insert mathematical expressions, chemical formulas, and symbolic notation, and provides compatibility with MathML for accessibility and digital publishing.

=== WIRIS Quizzes ===
WIRIS Quizzes is a STEM-focused assessment tool used to create automatically graded mathematics and science exercises within learning management systems environments. The system enables randomization of variables, algorithmic generation of problem sets, numeric and symbolic answers, and step-by-step feedback. It utilizes the CalcMe engine to evaluate expressions symbolically, enabling equivalence checking rather than strict string matching. WIRIS Quizzes is integrated into major learning management systems platforms and is used for mathematics homework, exams, and interactive practice activities.

=== LearningLemur ===
LearningLemur is a mathematics practice and assessment application designed primarily for use with Google Classroom. It enables teachers to assign exercises, monitor student progress, and provide immediate feedback. The platform generates an unlimited number of practice items and adapts to various curricular levels, enabling students to work on procedural and conceptual understanding. LearningLemur emphasizes ease of use for classroom workflows, offering automatic grading, reporting tools, and integration with Google’s educational ecosystem.

=== CalcMe ===
CalcMe is a browser-based computational environment developed by WIRIS for symbolic and numerical calculations, graphing, and step-by-step mathematical reasoning. It serves as a user interface for the CalcMe engine, allowing students and educators to manipulate expressions, explore functions, generate plots, and work through calculations interactively. CalcMe is used both as a standalone tool and within WIRIS Quizzes, where it supports dynamic problem solving and enriched feedback.

== Technology ==
WIRIS tools use standards-based mathematical markup, including MathML and LaTeX. The company provides plug-ins, APIs, and SDKs for integrating math editing and evaluation features in digital learning systems. Its ecosystem combines visual editing, symbolic computation, and automatic assessment capabilities.

== Applications ==
WIRIS products are used by educators, students, publishers, and educational technology companies. Common applications include creating mathematical notation in documents, designing automatically graded STEM assessments, embedding accessible math content in digital publications, and supporting online mathematics practice.

== See also ==
- Equation editor
- MathML
- LaTeX
- Computer algebra system
- Learning management system
- STEM education
