= Kig (software) =

Interactive geometry software

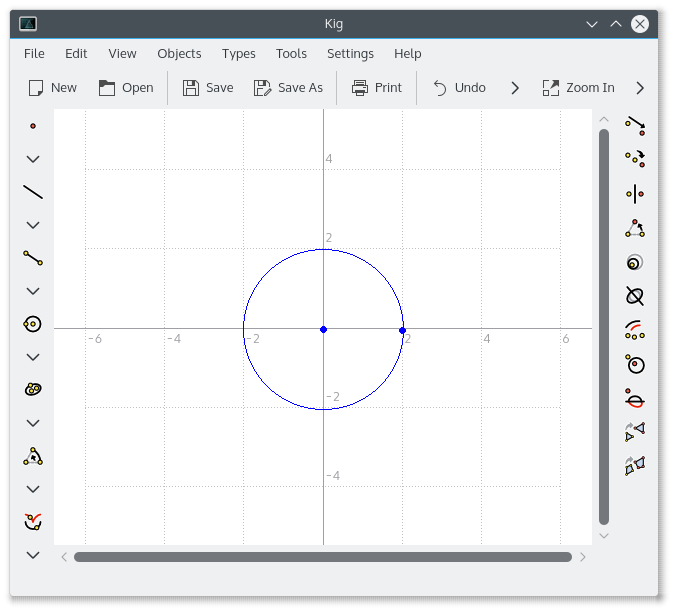
- Developer: KDE
- Release: 2 August 2006
- Stable release: 23.08.3 / 9 November 2023; 2 years ago
- Written in: C++ (Qt)
- Operating system: Unix-like, Mac OS X, Windows
- Type: Interactive geometry software
- License: GPL
- Website: https://apps.kde.org/kig/
- Repository: invent.kde.org/education/kig

KIG is free and open-source interactive geometry software, which is part of the KDE Education Project. It has some facilities for scripting in Python, as well as the creating macros from existing constructions.

== Import and export ==
Kig can import files made by DrGeo and Cabri Geometry as well as its own file format, which is XML-encoded. Kig can export figures in LaTeX format and as SVG (vector graphics) files.

== Objects ==
Kig can handle any classical object of the dynamic geometry, but also:

1. The center of curvature and osculating circle of a curve;
2. Dilation, generic affinity, inversion, projective application, homography and harmonic homology;
3. A hyperbola with given asymptotes;
4. Bézier curves (2nd and 3rd degree);
5. The polar line of a point and pole of a line with respect to a conic section;
6. The asymptotes of a hyperbola;
7. The cubic curve through 9 points;
8. The cubic curve with a double point through 6 points;
9. The cubic curve with a cusp through 4 points.

== Scripting language ==
=== Inside the figure ===
Another object is available inside Kig, it is a Python language script. It can accept Kig objects as variables, and always return one object.

For example, if there is already a numeric object inside the figure, for example 3, the following Python object can yield its square (9):

def square(arg1):
    return DoubleObject(arg1.value() ** 2)

The variables are always called arg1, arg2 etc. in the order they are clicked upon. Here there is only one variable arg1 and its numerical value is obtained with arg1.value().

If no one wants to implement the square of a complex number (represented by a point in the Argand diagram), the object which has to be selected at the creation of the script must necessarily be a point, and the script is

def csquare(arg1):
    x = arg1.coordinate().x
    y = arg1.coordinate().y
    z = x * x - y * y
    y = 2 * x * y
    x = z
    return Point(Coordinate(x, y))

The abscissa of the point representing the square of the complex number is $x^2-y^2$ as can be seen by expanding $(x+iy)^2=x^2-y^2+i(2xy)$, Coordinate(x,y) creates a Python list made of the two coordinates of the new point. And Point creates the point which coordinates are precisely given by this list.

But a Python object inside a figure can only create one object and for more complex figures one has to build the figure with a script:

=== Figure created by a script ===
Kig comes up with a little program (written in Python) called pykig.py which can

1. load a Python script, e.g. MyScript.py
2. build a Kig figure, described by this script
3. open Kig and display the figure.

For example, here is how a Sierpinski triangle can be made (as an IFS) with pykig:

from random import *
kigdocument.hideobjects()
A = Point(0, 2)
A.show()
B = Point(-2, -1)
B.show()
C = Point(2, -1)
C.show()
M = Point(.1, .1)
for i in range(1, 1000):
    d = randrange(3)
    if d == 0:
        s = Segment(A, M)
        M = s.midpoint()
    if d == 1:
        s = Segment(B, M)
        M = s.midpoint()
    if d == 2:
        s = Segment(C, M)
        M = s.midpoint()
    M.show()
