= Cabri Geometry =

Interactive geometry software

- Developer: Cabrilog
- Stable release: 2.1.1
- Operating system: Mac OS X, Windows
- Size: 40.9 MB
- Available in: English, French, Spanish, Italian, Hungarian, German, Polish, Portuguese, Chinese, Korean, Vietnamese, Japanese, Dutch, Norwegian, Danish, Czech, Slovak, Bosnian, Arabic
- Type: Interactive geometry software
- License: Proprietary
- Website: www.cabri.com

Cabri Geometry is a commercial interactive geometry software produced by the French company Cabrilog for teaching and learning geometry and trigonometry. It was designed with ease-of-use in mind. The program allows the user to animate geometric figures, proving a significant advantage over those drawn on a blackboard. Relationships between points on a geometric object may easily be demonstrated, which can be useful in the learning process. There are also graphing and display functions which allow exploration of the connections between geometry and algebra. The program can be run under Windows or Mac OS.

== History ==
Cabri Geometry was born from research conducted at the Joseph Fourier University of Grenoble and the CNRS (French National Centre for Scientific Research). The project was initiated in 1985 by mathematician and computer scientist Jean-Marie Laborde.

In the 1990s, the software's technology was integrated into graphing calculators developed by Texas Instruments, including the popular TI-92 and later the TI-83 and TI-84 series, making dynamic geometry accessible to a wider student population. To continue its development and commercialization, the standalone company Cabrilog was co-founded by Jean-Marie Laborde and Max Marcadet in 2000.

In 2014, Cabri products became available on Android, iOS, and Windows tablets, with the release of Cabri Express, a separate and lightweight version, marking a major expansion beyond desktop computers and TI calculators. This led to projects with various ministries of education to equip classrooms with the new tablet versions.

== See also ==
- Interactive geometry software – alternatives to Cabri Geometry
