= Comparison of software calculators =

This is a list of notable software calculators.

== Immediate execution calculators (button-oriented) ==
| Name | Software license | OS Support | Precision | Scientific mode | RPN mode | Hex/oct/bin mode |
|---|---|---|---|---|---|---|
| DeskCalc | MIT | Haiku | Arbitrary decimal | Yes | No | No |
| Desmos | Proprietary | Web browser, iOS, Android | Floating point | Yes | No | No |
| Mac OS calculator | Proprietary | macOS | Double (64 bit) | Yes | Yes | Yes |
| Calculator (Nintendo Switch) | Proprietary | Nintendo Switch | Fixed decimal (up to 16 digits) | Yes | No | No |
| Grapher | Proprietary | macOS | Double (64 bit) | Yes | No | No |
| GeoGebra | Varies | Web browser, Windows, macOS, Linux, iOS, Android | Arbitrary decimal | Yes | No | Yes |
| GNOME Calculator | GPL-3.0-or-later | Linux, BSDs, macOS | Arbitrary decimal | Yes | Yes | Yes |
| GraphCalc | GPL-2.0 | Windows, Linux | Double (64 bit) | Yes | No | Yes |
| KCalc | GPL-2.0-or-later | Linux, BSDs, macOS | Arbitrary decimal | Yes | Yes | Yes |
| Qalculate! | GPL-2.0-or-later | Linux, Windows, macOS | Arbitrary decimal | Yes | Yes | Yes |
| Windows Calculator | MIT | Windows | ≥32 decimal | Yes | No | Yes |
| WRPN Calculator | Public domain | Windows, Linux, macOS, Android | Float | Yes | Yes | Yes |
| xcalc | X11 | Linux | Arbitrary decimal | Yes | Yes | Yes |

== Expression or formula calculators (command-line oriented) ==
| Name | Software license | OS Support | Precision | Hex/oct/bin mode | RPN mode | Defining variables | Defining functions | Syntax highlighting | Unit conversion | Multiple Steps |
|---|---|---|---|---|---|---|---|---|---|---|
| Atari Calculator | Proprietary | Atari 800 | Float | Yes | Yes | Yes | Yes | No | Yes | Yes |
| bc programming language | GNU General Public License | Unix | Variable | Yes | Unknown | Yes | Yes | No | No | Unknown |
| Calcpad | MIT | Windows, Linux | double | No | No | Yes | Yes | Yes | Yes | Yes |
| Mathcad | Proprietary | Windows | Floating point (typically double) | Yes | No | Yes | Yes | Yes | Yes | Yes |
| Mathematica | Proprietary | Windows, macOS, Linux | Arbitrary precision | Yes | No | Yes | Yes | Yes | Yes | Yes |
| Maxima | GPL-2.0-or-later | Windows, macOS, Linux, BSD | Arbitrary precision | Yes | No | Yes | Yes | Yes | Yes | Yes |
| Symbolab | Proprietary | Web browser, iOS, Android | Symbolic and numeric | Yes | No | Yes | Yes | No | Yes | Yes |
| WolframAlpha | Proprietary | Web browser, iOS, Android | Arbitrary precision | Yes | No | Yes | Yes | No | Yes | Yes |

== See also ==
- Software calculator
- Calculator input methods
- Formula calculator
- Calculator
- Graphing calculator
- Scientific calculator
- Lists of mathematical software
- List of open-source software for mathematics
- List of spreadsheet software
