= Calculator (disambiguation) =

A calculator (in contemporary usage) is an electronic hand-held device that performs mathematical computations.

Calculator may also refer to:

- Calculator (software), a computer program that performs mathematical computations
  - Calculator (Windows), a computer program in Microsoft Windows
  - Calculator (Apple), a basic calculator application bundled with Apple devices
  - Calculator (Nintendo Switch), a paid application available for Nintendo Switch
- Mechanical calculator, a calculating device used from the 1700s to the mid-1900s
- Mental calculator, a person who performs calculations in their head
- Calculator (character), DC Comics villain
- Oxford Calculators, a group of 14th-century philosophers
- Calculator (band), an American emo band
- Richard Swineshead, English mathematician whose popular name was Calculator
