= Bootlegging (research and development) =

Unofficial corporate research and development

Bootlegging in corporate research and development is defined as "a non-formalised and non-declared (secret) bottom-up innovation process for the benefit of the bootlegger's firm." In corporate bootlegging, an employee works on a project or projects unconnected to their "official" work, and is generally allowed to do so in the understanding that it may benefit the company in some way; however, managerial approval is not always given. David A. Schon introduced the notion of bootlegging into economics and business administration literature in 1963.

Bootlegging, as it is illegitimate behaviour, may cause an ethical dilemma between moral imperatives (i.e. the anomie caused from management's action plan versus the task to innovate). However, sometimes bootlegging can be carried out in a conspiration with management (conspirational bootlegging). Bootlegging which continues despite explicit managerial disapproval is called "hardcore bootlegging" or "creative deviance".

== Causes ==
The main reason for the occurrence of bootlegging in corporations is the perceived lack of 'free space' for creativity in an employee's role. In particular, a business that emphasises elements of rigid planning – such as an enforced business hierarchy, an emphasis on project proposals, decisions only being taken after cautious initial findings – may clash with an employee's desire for experimental trial and error research.

Bootlegging, as a kind of self-regulating element, bridges the mechanistic world of organization with the chaotic world of creativity and innovation. The theory of path dependency explains why bootleg innovations are (most often) in line with the strategic objectives of the firm: corporate competencies define the search paths for its future. In this respect, the learning processes that are part of bootlegging, beside the tangible output of bootlegging, are beneficial for the firm. A wider explanatory framework can be the "constructive deviance" model.

Bootlegging should not be confused with skunk works: skunk work is defined as a sort of elite, working officially on a given project alongside the formal organization to solve problems more efficiently. In fact the Pacific tech's Graphing Calculator project, NuCalc, at Apple Computer was not a skunk works project but a bootleg project.

== Permitted bootlegging ==
Permitted bootlegging is research time where technical staff are allowed to spend a certain amount of their time working on 'pet-projects' in the hope that some day there is some return for the company. Famous examples of companies that follow such an initiative are 3M and Hewlett-Packard. They allow 10 to 15 percent of the working time for own product related interests.

A well-known example of a permitted bootleg product is the yellow sticky Post-it note developed by Arthur Fry and Spencer Silver at 3M.

Another famous example is Google, where employees are allowed to spend up to 20% of their work time in personal projects related to the company's business. Several services provided by Google such as Gmail, Google News, Orkut and AdSense were originally created by employees in their work time.

When permitted bootlegging is open to any member of an organization, regardless of function or seniority, it is called Grassroots innovation.

== In other languages ==
The specific phrase used to describe bootlegging varies by language. Quite a few firms have their own specific terms for it.

- English: Friday afternoon work, work behind the fume cupboard, freelance work, under-counter work, under-table work, pet project, discretionary research, free-wheeling, illicit research, scrounging, renegade work, work in the shadow/underworld, unsanctioned innovation, unsponsored innovation, un-solicited innovation, autonomous initiatives, self-organized innovation, stealth innovation.
- French: recherche camouflée ("camouflaged research"), recherche cachée ("hidden research"), recherche parallele ("parallel research" or "research on the side"), recherche libre ("free research"), recherche en perruque (literally "research in a wig"), recherche sauvage ("uncontrolled research" or "unmetered research"), or recherche sous-marine ("submarine research").
- German: U-Boot-Forschung (literally "submarine science"), or graue Projekte ("gray projects").

== See also ==
- Skunkworks project
