= Last Hope =

Last Hope or The Last Hope may refer to:

== Video games ==
- Last Hope (video game), 2006 scrolling shooter game
- Torneko: The Last Hope, 1999 role-playing game
- Star Ocean: The Last Hope, 2009 action role-playing game
- Serious Sam VR: The Last Hope, 2017 first-person shooter game
- The Last Hope: Dead Zone Survival, 2023 survival game

== Television ==
- Last Hope (TV series), or Jūshinki Pandora, a 2018 Japanese-Chinese anime series
- Last Hope, a 2013 Japanese drama series
- "The Last Hope", the twenty-sixth episode of Lego Ninjago: Masters of Spinjitzu

== Literature ==
- Last Hope (manga), 2005 original English-language manga
- The Last Hope, a novel in the Warriors: Omen of the Stars series

== Other uses ==
- Last Hope Province, a translation of Última Esperanza Province, a province in Chile
- "Last Hope", a song from Paramore (album)
- The Last HOPE, a hacker conference put on by Hackers on Planet Earth
