= Graphing Calculator =

Graphing Calculator may refer to:

- Graphing calculators, calculators that are able to display and/or analyze mathematical function graphs
- NuCalc, a computer software program able to perform many graphing calculator functions
- Grapher, the Mac OS X successor to NuCalc
