= Qalculate! =

Free and open-source calculator software

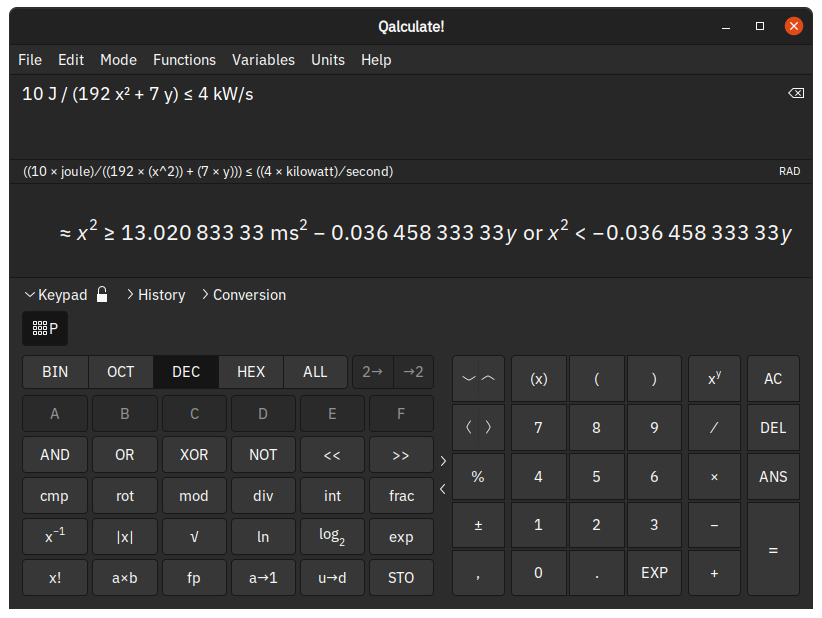
- A screenshot of qalculate-gtk
- Original authors: Hanna Knutsson, Sven Herzberg
- Developer: Hanna Knutsson
- Initial release: 2 August 2003; 22 years ago (version 0.1)
- Stable release: 5.2.0 / 10 July 2024; 20 months ago
- Written in: C++
- Operating system: Linux; Windows macOS
- Platform: Winget; Windows installer Snap; Flatpak; Standalone executable
- Type: Math, calculator
- License: GPL
- Website: qalculate.github.io
- Repository: github.com/Qalculate

Qalculate! is an arbitrary precision cross-platform software calculator. It supports complex mathematical operations and concepts such as differentiation, integration, data plotting, and unit conversion. It is a free and open-source software released under GPL v2.

== Features ==
Qalculate! supports common mathematical functions and operations, multiple bases, autocompletion, complex numbers, infinite numbers, arrays and matrices, variables, mathematical and physical constants, user-defined functions, symbolic derivation and integration, solving of equations involving unknowns, uncertainty propagation using interval arithmetic, plotting using Gnuplot, unit and currency conversion and dimensional analysis, and provides a periodic table of elements, as well as several functions for computer science, such as character encoding and bitwise operations.

It provides four interfaces: two GUIs, one using GTK (qalculate-gtk) and another using Qt (qalculate-qt), a library for use in other programs (libqalculate), and a CLI program for use in a terminal (qalc).

- Qalculate! (GTK+ GUI): qalculate-gtk
- Qalculate! (Qt GUI): qalculate-qt
- Qalculate! (CLI): qalc (usually provided by the libqalculate package)
- Qalculate! (Library): libqalculate

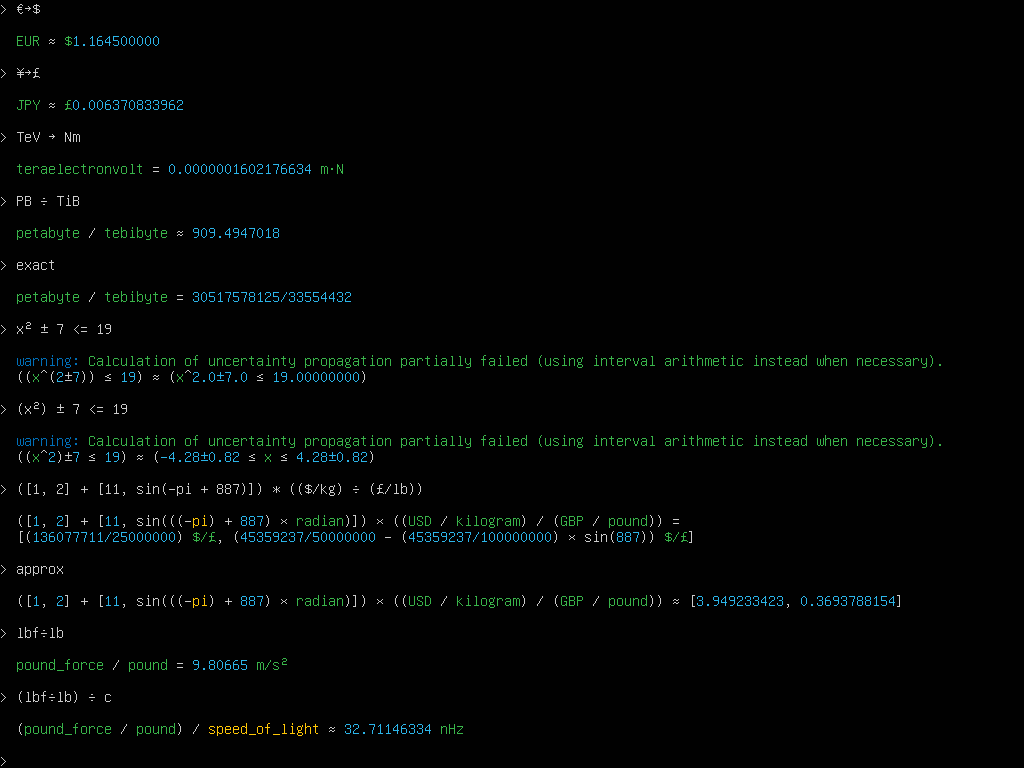
A session with the qalc CLI

== Use in academic research ==
- Bartel, Alexandre. "DOS Software Security: Is there Anyone Left to Patch a 25-year old Vulnerability?."
  - "In our example of Figure 7, we choose to execute /usr/bin/qalculate-gtk, a calculator. Since the stack of the DOSBox process is non-executable, we cannot directly inject our shellcode on it."
  - "The Gnome calculator was used to perform these calculations and the results were verified using the Qalculate! calculator and WolframAlpha (15) since spreadsheets are unable to perform these calculations."

== See also ==
- Mathematical software
- List of open-source software for mathematics
- List of arbitrary-precision arithmetic software
- Comparison of software calculators
