= WRPN Calculator =

Software emulating a scientific calculator

WRPN
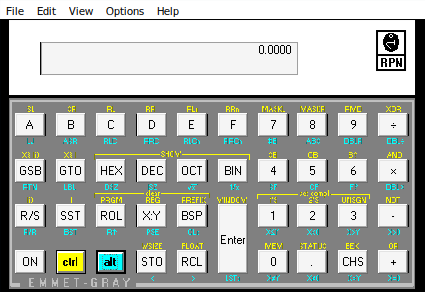
- WRPN 1.0 screenshot
- Other names: Windows Reverse Polish Notation
- Developer(s): Emmet P. Gray
- Initial release: 1.0 / April 3, 1995; 30 years ago
- Stable release: 7.1.1 / August 26, 2024; 9 months ago
- Written in: Borland C++, C#, VB.NET, ASP.NET. Java
- Operating system: Windows, Linux, Unix-like, Mac OS, Android
- Platform: x86-16, IA-32, x86-64, ARM
- Successor: JRPN
- Standard(s): RPN
- Available in: English
- Type: Math, Calculator
- License: Public domain
- Website: wrpn.emmet-gray.com

WRPN (or Windows Reverse Polish Notation) is an open-source scientific software calculator, simulating the Hewlett-Packard Voyager series' HP-16C "Computer Scientist" programmable calculator.

== History ==
On April 3, 1995, Emmet P. Gray, an American programmer, at the time civilian employee at the US Army, now adjunct professor at the Texas A&M University, released WRPN 1.0 (16-bit), a public domain open-source software written in Borland C++ 4.0 for early versions of Microsoft Windows.

As of September 2024 the project is still in active development, and the latest WRPN 7.1.1 was released on August 26, 2024, for modern operating systems with Java installed, and as a mobile application for Android. Source code is available in C#, VB.NET, ASP.NET and Java.

== Features ==
WRPN simulates almost all of the functions of HP-16C:

- RPN (Reverse Polish notation) input support
- Floating point, Decimal, Hexadecimal, Octal and Binary modes
- Word sizes from 1–64 bits per word
- Signed math
- Logical operators
- Bitwise operators
- 32 storage registers
- 4 position stack
- 203 lines of program memory

== JRPN ==
In 2019 Bill Foote, an American software engineer and ex-Lead of the Sun Microsystems' standardization of interactive technologies for Blu-ray and other TV platforms, created the JRPN (JOVIAL Reverse Polish Notation Calculators), an open-source HP-16C simulator, forked from WRPN 6.0.2 in Java, but with all of the text set to be rendered from vector fonts (instead of the bitmap font used in WRPN), and licensed it under the free Apache License.

I always wanted a 16C, but I never really needed it, and I was a starving student at the time :-) WRPN works great on Android, but the UI uses images that were created back when screen resolutions weren't so high, so I dropped Emmet a line, and re-did some of the UI and published that as what I'm now calling "Legacy JRPN".

— Bill Foote, Why Another Calculator Simulator?, jrpn.jovial.com

During the COVID-19 pandemic Foote fully rewrote JRPN code in Flutter and licensed it under GPLv3. JRPN is available now in two variants, 15C and 16C (simulating HP-15C and HP-16C accordingly), for Android, Linux, Mac OS, Windows and as a web application.

Also there is another RPN calculator of the same name, developed by William Giel as freeware proprietary software. It has been last released in 1999.

== Gallery ==
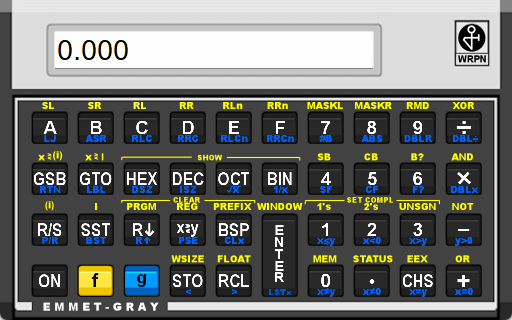
WRPN, bitmap fonts UI

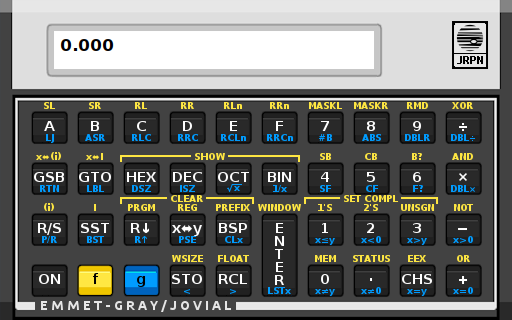
JRPN (Legacy), vector fonts UI

== See also ==
- Comparison of software calculators
