= KCalc =

KDE calculator application

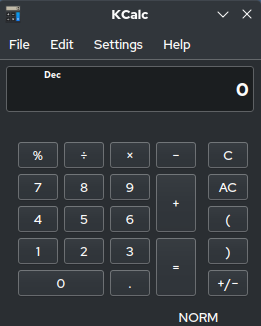
- KCalc 21.12.0 (default view)
- Developers: Evan Teran, Klaus Niederkrüger, Bernd Johannes Wuebben, The KDE Team
- Stable release: 24.12.0 / 2 December 2024
- Repository: invent.kde.org/utilities/kcalc
- Operating system: Unix-like
- Type: Math, Calculator
- License: GPL-2.0-or-later
- Website: utils.kde.org/projects/kcalc

KCalc is a scientific software calculator integrated with the KDE Gear.

== Functions ==
KCalc includes trigonometric functions, logic operations, saved previous results, copy and paste, a configure UI, and statistical computations. The history function uses a stack method. KCalc also supports boolean operations.

KCalc does not support graphing.

Since version 2 (included in KDE 3.5) KCalc offers arbitrary precision.

== Gallery ==
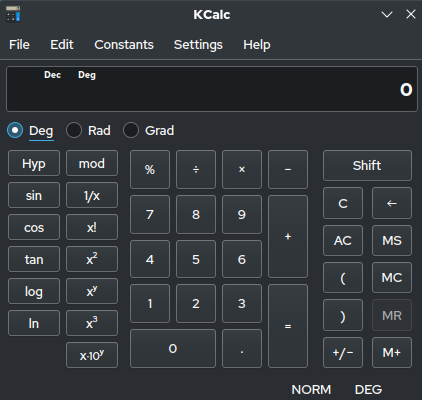
Science mode

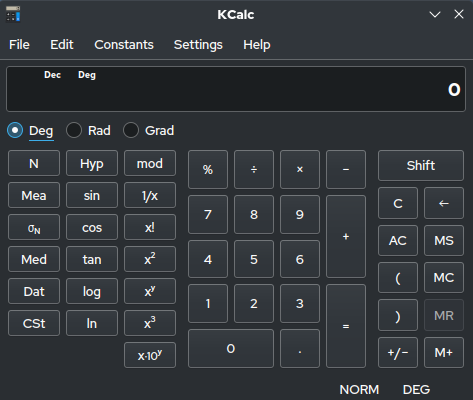
Statistic mode

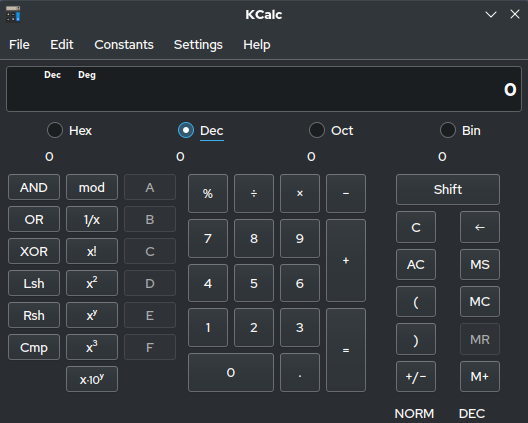
Numeral System mode

== See also ==
- Comparison of software calculators
- GNOME Calculator
