= Calculator (Nintendo Switch) =

2021 video game console software

- Developer: Sabec
- Release: May 12, 2021
- Platform: Nintendo Switch
- Type: Software calculator

Calculator is a software calculator released by Sabec for the Nintendo Switch, a video game console, in May 2021. It was widely criticized for its US$10 price point and platform, with critics noting that better-suited devices featured free software with equivalent functionality. As an Internet meme, Calculator became one of Metacritic's best-rated games for the Switch by user score. It was cited as an influence on subsequent utility software releases on the Nintendo eShop.

== Overview ==
Calculator replicates a scientific calculator, including methods to compute elementary arithmetic, trigonometric functions, and logarithms. It visually resembles the calculator app bundled with iOS devices. Calculator was developed by the British company Sabec for the Nintendo Switch, a video game console. Before it, the company had been known for releasing utility software and simple games for the platform. These include a piano, drum set, and guitar, as well as a night vision app that uses the Joy-Con's infrared sensor. TouchArcade's Shaun Musgrave, who had regularly reported on Sabec's releases, regarded them as "over-priced, virtually useless software". Calculator was first listed on the Nintendo eShop on May 11, 2021, and released on May 12. It was priced at US$10 or £8.09. Sabec advertised it as being suited for students and engineers. The app was later rated for ages 3 and up by the International Age Rating Coalition and then released in Japan on June 24 at ¥899.

== Reception ==
Calculator was the first Sabec app to go viral. It was widely criticized for its price point, which was more expensive than some physical calculators, while not offering more features than free alternatives for smartphones and personal computers. Publications that criticized Calculator's price–performance ratio include CNET, Engadget, Eurogamer, GameSpot, Gfinity, Kotaku, Nintendo Life, and TechRadar. Several critics questioned its usefulness, as there were devices better suited to use as calculators. Musgrave considered it not to be the company's worst release and highlighted the comedic aspect of using a calculator on a gaming platform. Henry Stockdale, in his review for Gfinity, noted that the app's widescreen layout felt unnatural for a calculator. Adam Vjestica, writing for TechRadar, considered Calculator proof of the faulty maintenance of the eShop, saying that "the bar is so low, that as long as a game works, it'll be allowed to slither onto the eShop, even if it stinks up the joint in the process". He believed that the number of low-quality releases, as well as the media coverage they attained, hampered the visibility of higher-quality indie games.

Calculator became an Internet meme. On Metacritic, a review aggregator for video games and other media, users review-bombed the app with perfect 10/10 scores accompanied by humorous comments. This gave Calculator an average user score of 9.1/10 within days of its release, ranking it as the fifth-best Switch game by user score, on par with Monster Hunter Rise. In speedrunning, SmallAnt, a video game streamer, set the record for counting to 1,000 using Calculator in 38 seconds.

== Legacy ==
Following the popularity of Calculator, Sabec released further non-game software on the eShop, including a xylophone, a handpan, and Spy Alarm, which uses the Joy-Con's infrared sensor to detect motion. The company also developed licensed games based on the British game show Bullseye and the character Popeye. Calculator has been cited as an influence on other non-game products coming to the eShop, such as the note-taking software Notes released by Game Nacional in June 2021. In August, it spawned the multiplayer game Battle Calculator by Blacksmith DoubleCircle, in which up to four players compete to compute a given number as quickly as possible.

== See also ==
- The Last Hope: Dead Zone Survival – another product cited when criticizing the eShop's quality control
