= Grassroots =

Movement based in local communities

A grassroots movement is a political or social movement based upon the people in a given district, region, or community. Grassroots movements and organizations use collective action from volunteers at the local level to implement change at the local, regional, national, or international levels. Grassroots movements are sometimes considered more natural or spontaneous than more traditional power structures.

Grassroots movements, using self-organization, encourage community members to take responsibility and action for their community. Grassroots movements use a variety of strategies, from fundraising and registering voters to simply encouraging political conversation. The goals of specific movements vary, but the movements are consistent in their focus on increasing mass participation in politics. These political movements may begin as small and local, but grassroots politics, as Cornel West contends, are necessary to shaping progressive politics as they bring public attention to regional political concerns.

The idea of grassroots is often conflated with participatory democracy. The Port Huron Statement, a manifesto seeking a more democratic society, says that to create a more equitable society, "the grass roots of American Society" must be the basis of civil rights and economic reform movements. The terms can be distinguished in that grassroots often refers to a specific movement or organization, whereas participatory democracy refers to the larger system of governance.

== History ==
The origins of "grass roots" as a political metaphor are obscure. In the United States, an early use of the phrase "grassroots and boots" is thought to have been coined by Senator Albert Jeremiah Beveridge of Indiana, who said of the Progressive Party in 1912, "This party has come from the grass roots. It has grown from the soil of people's hard necessities".

A 1907 newspaper article about Ed Perry, vice chairman of the Oklahoma state committee, stated, "Regarding his political views, Mr. Perry has issued the following terse platform: 'I am for a square deal, grass root representation, for keeping close to the people, against ring rule and for fair treatment.'" A 1904 news article on a campaign for Eli Torrance, a possible Theodore Roosevelt running mate, quotes a Kansas political organizer: "Roosevelt and Torrance clubs will be organized in every locality. We will begin at the grass roots".

Since the early 1900s, grassroots movements have been widespread in both the United States and other countries. Major examples include parts of the American civil rights movement of the 1950s and 1960s, the Brazilian land equity movement of the 1970s and beyond, the Chinese rural democracy movement of the 1980s, and the German peace movement of the 1980s.

A particular example of grassroots politics in the American Civil Rights Movement was the 1951 case of William Van Til, who worked on the integration of the Nashville Public Schools. Van Til worked to create a grassroots movement focused on discussing race relations at the local level. To that end, he founded the Nashville Community Relations Conference, which brought together leaders from various communities in Nashville to discuss the possibility of integration. Residents of Nashville responded to his attempts to communicate with black community leaders with violence and scare tactics. However, Van Til was ultimately instrumental in integrating the Peabody College of Education in Nashville. Furthermore, the desegregation plan proposed by the Nashville Community Relations Conference was implemented by Nashville schools in 1957. This movement is characterized as grassroots because it focuses on changing a norm at the local level using local power.

The Brazilian Landless Workers Movement (MST) was founded in the 1970s and has become an international organization. The MST focuses on organizing young farmers and their children in fighting for a variety of rights, particularly the right to access land. The movement sought community leaders and employed strategies of direct action, including land occupations. It largely maintained autonomy from the Brazilian government. The MST traces its roots to discontent arising from large land inequalities in Brazil in the 1960s. This discontent gained traction, particularly after Brazil became a democracy in 1985. The movement focused especially on occupying land that was considered unproductive. In the 1990s, the influence of the MST grew following two mass killings of protestors. Successful protests were those in which the families of those occupying properties received plots of land. Although the grassroots efforts of the MST were successful in Brazil, when similar strategies were employed by the South African Landless People's Movement (LPM) in 2001, they were not nearly as successful. Land occupations in South Africa were politically contentious and did not achieve the positive results seen by the MST.

The National People's Congress was a grassroots democratic reform movement that came out of the existing Chinese government in 1987. It encouraged grassroots elections in villages throughout China with the purpose of bringing democracy to the local level of government. Reforms took the form of self-governing village committees elected in a competitive, democratic process. Xu Wang from Princeton University called the Congress mutually empowering for the state and the peasantry; the state was given a renewed level of legitimacy by the democratic reforms, and the peasantry was given far more political power. This resulted in increased voting rate, particularly for the poor, and increased levels of political awareness, according to Wang. One example of the increased accountability from the new institutions was a province in which villagers gave 99,000 suggestions to the local government. Ultimately, 78,000 of these were adopted, indicating a high rate of governmental responsiveness.

The 1980s German peace movement is also considered a grassroots movement. The movement traces its roots to the 1950s movement opposing nuclear armament, the "Ban the Bomb" movement. In the 1980s, the German peace movement became far bigger. In 1981, 800 organizations pushed the government to reduce the size of the military. The push culminated in a protest by 300,000 people in the German capital, Bonn. The movement was successful in producing a grassroots organization, the Coordination Committee, which directed the efforts of the peace movements in the following years. The committee ultimately failed to decrease the size of the German military, but it laid the groundwork for protests of the Iraq War in the 2000s and started a public dialogue about policy directed at peace and security.

Another example of a grassroots movement in the 1980s was the Citizens Clearinghouse for Natural Waste, an organization that united communities and various grassroots groups in the United States in support of more environmentally friendly methods of dealing with natural waste. The movement focused especially on African American communities and other minorities. It sought to bring awareness to those communities and alter the focus from moving problematic waste to changing the system that produced such waste. The success of these movements largely remains to be seen.

== Strategies of grassroots movements ==
Grassroots movements use tactics that build off of local and community movements. Grassroots Campaigns, a for-profit corporation dedicated to creating and supporting grassroots movements in America, says that grassroots movements aim to raise money, build organizations, raise awareness, build name recognition, win campaigns, and deepen political participation. Grassroots movements work toward these and other goals via strategies focusing on local participation in either local or national politics.

Grassroots organizations seek to engage ordinary people in political discourse to the greatest extent possible. Below is a list of strategies considered to be grassroots because of their focus on engaging the populace:

- Hosting house meetings or parties
- Having larger meetings, such as annual general meetings
- Putting up posters
- Talking with pedestrians on the street or walking door-to-door (often involving informational clipboards)
- Gathering signatures for petitions
- Mobilizing letter-writing, phone-calling, and emailing campaigns
- Setting up information tables
- Raising money from many small donors for political advertising or campaigns
- Organizing large demonstrations
- Asking individuals to submit opinions to media outlets and government officials
- Holding get out the vote activities, which involve reminding people to vote and transporting them to polling places.

== Use of online social networks ==
Social media's prominence in political and social activism skyrocketed in the 2010s. Apps such as Instagram and Twitter have become commonly used by growing grassroots movements to inform and organize participants.

=== Hashtags ===
Social media platforms use hashtags to group postings from across the network under a unifying message. Some hashtags that stirred up larger media coverage include the #MeToo movement, which began in 2017 in response to sexual assault allegations against prominent figures in the American entertainment industry. Grassroots movements also use hashtags to organize on a large scale on social media. Some examples include:

- BlackLivesMatter: This hashtag came to embody a movement.
- LoveWins: After the Supreme Court of the United States ruled in favor of legalizing same-sex marriage, supporters of same-sex marriage used the hashtag #LoveWins.
- Resist: This hashtag, used in cities throughout America, is another example of the power of organization through media platforms. It was used by event planning sites like Meetup.com to bring together members of a community who wanted to get involved politically. It was used for such purposes in the case of #Resist:Dallas.

== Examples ==
=== Barry Goldwater 1964 presidential campaign ===
Barry Goldwater, a junior senator from Arizona and standard-bearer of conservative Republicans, announced his presidential candidacy on January 3, 1964. Goldwater focused on goals such as reducing the size of the federal government, lowering taxes, promoting free enterprise, fighting communism, and a strong commitment to U.S. global leadership, which appealed strongly to conservatives in the Republican Party.

Despite vehement opposition from the leaders of his party's dominant moderate-liberal wing, such as New York governor Nelson Rockefeller and Michigan governor George Romney, Goldwater secured the Republican nomination. He sparked a grassroots movement among young conservatives by presenting himself as honest, committed, and a genuine politician. The majority of his campaign donations were by individual supporters, and only one-third of donations were greater than $500.

=== Earth Hour ===
Earth Hour is a worldwide movement aimed at bringing awareness to environmental issues. It started in 2007 in Sydney, Australia, as a mass electrical outage that the citizens participated in. The World Wild Life (WWF) also has an Earth Hour. While the day for the hourlong outage varies, it typically occurs between March 20 and March 31. Many countries worldwide participate in Earth Hour, such as Colombia, Australia, and Pakistan. Corporations, like Hard Rock International, and governments have also taken part in Earth Hour. The movement is online as well, using #EarthHour on social media platforms. Earth Hour is also focused on local efforts in climate advocacy in different countries.

=== UK grassroots aid movement ===
In 2015, the refugee crisis in Europe became front-page news around the world. Affected by images of the plight of refugees arriving and traveling across Europe, the grassroots aid movement (otherwise known as the people-to-people or people solidarity movement), consisting of thousands of private individuals with no prior NGO experience, formed groups providing aid to refugees. The first wave of early responders reached camps in Calais and Dunkirk in August 2015 and joined forces with existing local charities supporting the inhabitants there. Other volunteers journeyed to support refugees in Macedonia, the Balkans, and the Greek islands. Grassroots aid saved lives by plugging gaps in the system between governments and existing charities.

=== The Axis of Justice ===
The Axis of Justice (AofJ) is a not-for-profit group founded by Tom Morello and Serj Tankian. Its purpose is to promote social justice by connecting musicians and music enthusiasts to progressive grassroots ideals. The group appeared at music festivals, including Lollapalooza in 2003. The AofJ most regularly appears when the bands System of a Down or Audioslave are performing. The group also has a podcast on XM Satellite radio and KPFK (90.7 FM), a Pacifica Radio station in Los Angeles, California.

== Criticism ==
=== Top-down vs. bottom-up processing ===
There is debate about whether a top-down or bottom-up approach is better suited to address the problems communities face. Top-down processing involves large-scale programs or high-level frameworks, often driven by governmental or international action. Top-down processing is typically better funded than bottom-up processing and is well-suited to tracking large-scale causal relationships in environmental systems. Top-down processing is typically designed by outsiders who can only perceive a community's needs; as a result, community needs are often only marginally addressed or not addressed at all. In contrast, bottom-up processing is defined as "observing or monitoring efforts defined and undertaken at the local scale and brought forward to higher-level bodies, often with a focus on supporting outcomes desired by a local community." In bottom-up processing, "local residents and people of color co-facilitate the trainings and workshops", which "empowers participants." Bottom-up approaches are often not impactful beyond local settings. Grassroots organizations adopt a bottom-up approach because it often allows for direct community participation.

=== Issues with horizontal movements ===
Grassroots movements are sometimes criticized for their tendency to be leaderless and horizontal. Some argue that social movements without a clear hierarchy are far less effective and more likely to die off.

Horizontalism is a term from Argentina's 2001 protests that traces back to Bevin's New Left in 1968. The main idea of the term is no leaders and no hierarchies. This means that each person is free to assent or dissent, and decisions are made by small groups unanimously. These movements grow where there is a lack of democracy. The movements are meant to allow members to discuss what the outcome for their country should be. Lack of leadership, however, can cause a lack of action.

=== Astroturfing ===
Astroturfing refers to political action that is meant to appear to be grassroots, but in fact comes from an outside organization, such as a corporation or think tank. It is named after AstroTurf, a brand of artificial grass. An example of astroturfing is the ExxonMobil Corporation's push to disseminate false information about climate change. ExxonMobil largely succeeded both in disseminating the information through think tanks and in disguising the true nature of the think tanks.

More controversial examples of astroturfing often exhibit some characteristics of a real grassroots organization. Many of former United States president Barack Obama's efforts, for example, have been deemed grassroots because of their focus on involving the electorate at large. Critics of Obama have argued that some of these methods are in fact astroturfing. For example, the Reason Foundation has accused Obama of planting astroturfed supporters in town hall meetings. Many movements and organizations are on a continuum between grassroots and astroturf instead of being entirely one or the other. For example, Australia's Convoy of No Confidence, a movement seeking to force an early election in 2011, incorporated elements of grassroots infrastructure in its reliance on the anger and discontentment of participants. It also had elements of astroturfing, namely its reliance on support from political elites in the opposition party.

The Tea Party movement, a conservative force in American politics that began in 2009, is also a controversial example of astroturfing. Critics, notably including Obama and Speaker of the House Nancy Pelosi, dismissed the Tea Party as astroturfed. They say that the movement purports to represent large swaths of America when in reality it comes from a select few billionaires seeking favorable policies. The Tea Party has argued that it comes from broad popular support, widespread anger at the Democratic Party, and disenchantment with the Republican Party. Defenders of the Tea Party cite polls that find substantial support for the movement, indicating some basis in grassroots politics. Critics point to the corporate influence on the Tea Party, which they claim indicates that the movement is more top-down than the grassroots rhetoric would suggest. The Tea Party is considered grassroots to the extent that it comes from the people, but it is considered astroturfing to the extent that it is shaped by corporations and particularly wealthy individuals.

== Current examples ==
- Earth Hour International: A movement created by WWF Australia, advertising agency Leo Burnett Sydney, and Fairfax Media; it has described itself as "the world's largest grass roots movement".
- Bernie Sanders 2016 presidential campaign: This has been deemed by some a grassroots campaign because of its focus on small donations, massive rallies, and other grassroots-style politicking methods.
- Momentum in the United Kingdom: A grassroots movement supporting Jeremy Corbyn and the Labour Party.

=== Use in sport ===
The term "grassroots" is used by a number of sporting organizational bodies to reference the lowest, most elementary form of a game. Some examples of this use are FIFA's Grassroots Programme and the Football Federation Australia's "Goals for Grassroots" initiative.

== See also ==
- Grassroots democracy
- Grassroots fundraising
- Grassroots lobbying
- Grassroots innovation
