= Calculator (band) =

- Origin: Westchester, Los Angeles, California
- Genres: Emo
- Years active: 2007–2015
- Label: Count Your Lucky Stars

Calculator was an American emo band from Westchester, Los Angeles, California.

== History ==
Calculator self-released a split with the band Moldar in mid-2009. Later that year, Calculator released their first full-length album titled These Roots Grow Deep on Melotov Records. Calculator released a 7" in 2011 titled New Forms. In 2014, Calculator signed with Count Your Lucky Stars Records and released their second full-length album titled This Will Come To Pass. In June 2014, Calculator was featured on a four-way split titled The Sound Of Young America with the bands Capacities, Innards, and Itto. In late 2014, Calculator released an EP on Count Your Lucky Stars titled Calc.
