= GNOME Calculator =

Calculator software

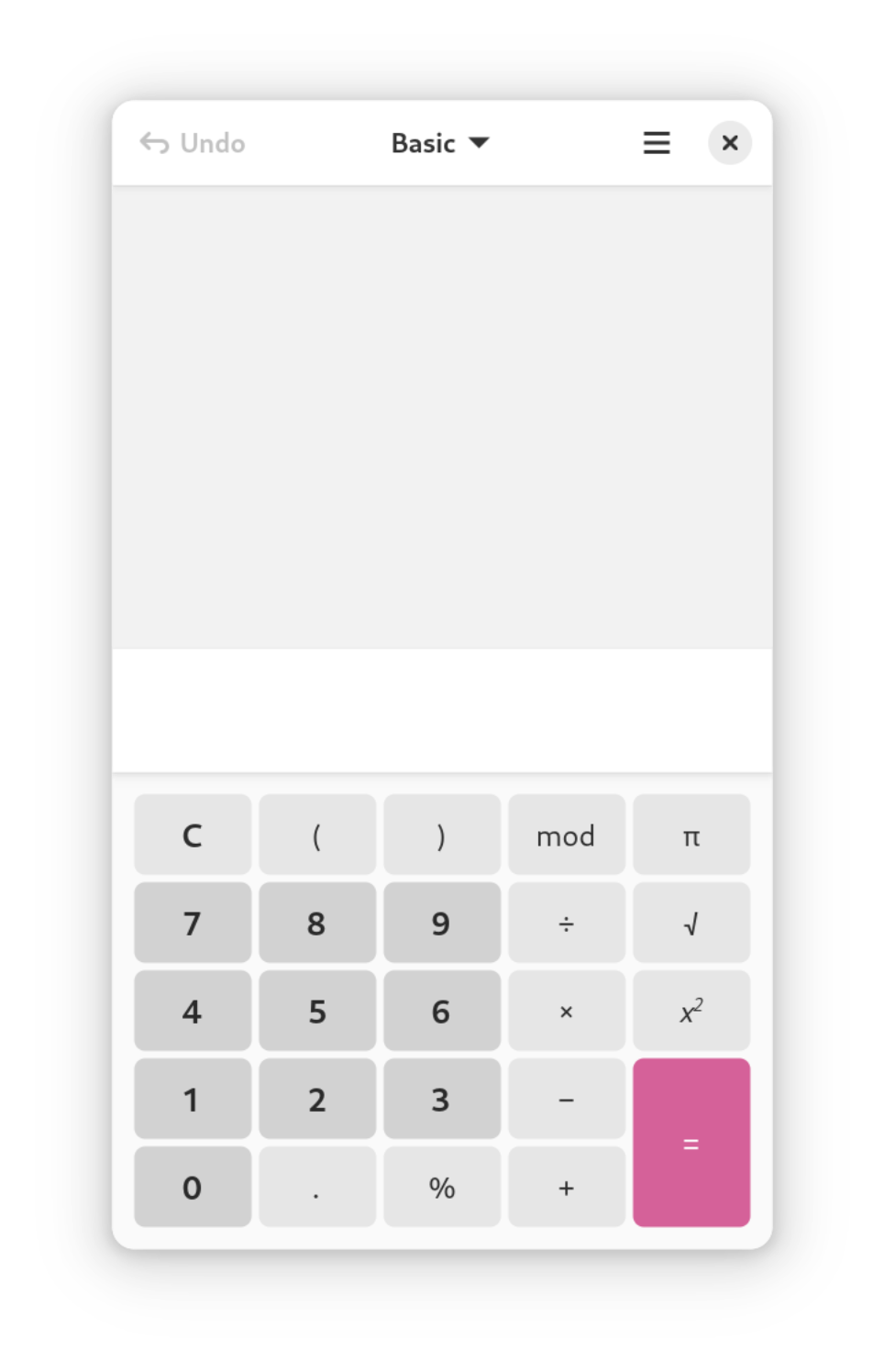
- GNOME Calculator 47
- Stable release: 48.1 / 13 April 2025; 14 March 2026
- Written in: C, Vala
- Operating system: Unix-like
- Type: Software calculator
- License: GPL-3.0-or-later
- Website: apps.gnome.org/app/org.gnome.Calculator
- Repository: gitlab.gnome.org/GNOME/gnome-calculator.git

GNOME Calculator, formerly known as gcalctool, is the software calculator integrated with the GNOME desktop environment. It is programmed in C and Vala and part of the GNOME Core Applications.

== Mathematics ==
GNOME Calculator uses the MPFR library for extended precision arithmetic. It can support complex number arithmetic, perform factorization of integers, and define new functions by composition.

== Views ==
While most functionality can be accessed by typing the function name into the input, Calculator provides different views for convenience.

- Basic – interface for basic arithmetic, resembling a desk calculator.
- Advanced – an interface with scientific functions, and support for custom variables. New functions can be defined by function composition.
- Financial – financial calculation and currency conversion.
- Programming – a view with bit manipulation operators and radix conversion.
- Keyboard – most of the space is taken up by the output, with no on-screen buttons. Supports currency and unit conversion.
- Conversion – A view for performing conversions between units.

== Notation ==
The GNOME calculator uses the common infix notation for binary functions, such as the four basic arithmetic operations. Unlike many other calculators, it uses prefix notation, not postfix notation for unary functions. So to calculate e.g. the sine of one, the user must push the keys sin+1+=, not 1+sin, as on many other calculators.

The decimal separator on the number pad is based on the general keyboard layout since version 3.12.3. Due to different styles of formatting decimal positions across the world, Calculator interprets both commas and periods as decimal separators. Consequently, using k-ary functions requires using a semicolon to separate the arguments.

== See also ==
- Comparison of software calculators
- KCalc
