= System 1 =

1984 operating system version

Macintosh "System 1"
- Version of the classic Mac OS operating system
- The original "System 1" desktop
- Developer: Apple Computer
- OS family: Macintosh
- Source model: Closed source
- Released to manufacturing: January 24, 1984; 42 years ago
- Latest release: 1.1 / December 29, 1984; 41 years ago
- Kernel type: Monolithic
- License: Proprietary
- Succeeded by: System 2

Support status
- Architectural, unsupported

The Macintosh "System 1" is the first major release of the classic Mac OS operating system. It was developed for the Motorola 68000 microprocessor. System 1 was released on January 24, 1984, along with the Macintosh 128K, the first in the Macintosh family of personal computers. It received one update, "System 1.1" on December 29, 1984, before being succeeded by System 2.

== Features ==
This operating system introduced many features that would appear for years to come, some that still exist in the current macOS, and a few that exist in other graphical operating systems such as Microsoft Windows.

The features of the operating system included the Finder and menu bar. In addition to this, it popularized the graphical user interface and desktop metaphor, which was used under license from Xerox PARC.

Due to the limited amount of random-access memory and the lack of an internal hard disk in the original Macintosh, there was no multitasking with multiple applications, although there were desktop accessories that could run while another application was loaded. Also, items in the Trash were permanently deleted when the computer was shut down or an application was loaded (quitting the Finder).

System 1's total size is about 216 KB. It comprised six files: System (which includes the desk accessories), Finder, Clipboard, an Imagewriter printer driver, Scrapbook, and Note Pad. A separate diskette included "A Guided Tour of Macintosh", which contains tutorial demonstrations of the Macintosh system, running on a modified pre-release version of Finder 1.0, as well as training programs for learning to use the mouse, and the Finder. Also included was a 33-minute audio cassette designed to run alongside the demonstrations, emphasising the disk's purpose as a guided tour.

=== Menu bar ===
The menu bar was a new and revolutionary part of the OS. Similar to the one found on Lisa OS, the System 1 Finder had five menus: the Apple menu, File, Edit, View, and Special. When in an application, the menus would change to ones defined by the application, but most software retained at least the File and Edit menus.

While within the Finder, the Apple menu contained the "About the Finder" information, along with the desktop accessories. "File" menu items included Open, Eject, and Close. "Edit" had entries for cutting, copying, and pasting. "Special" was used for managing the hardware and other system functions, and was always the rightmost entry on the menu bar in the Finder. In System 1, the menu had items related to emptying the Trash, cleaning up the desktop, and disk options. By System 1.1, the menu allowed the user to choose an alternate startup program to be run instead of the Finder at boot time; the feature was replaced in System 7 by the "Startup Items" folder in the System Folder.

=== Desk accessories ===
System 1 came with multiple desk accessories (DAs). These included an Alarm Clock, Calculator, Control Panel, Key Caps, Note Pad, Puzzle, and Scrapbook. One difference between desktop accessories and applications is that multiple desktop accessories could be run at once but only one application could run at a time. Desk accessories could also run on top of an application.

- Alarm Clock: This DA could be used just like an alarm clock, as the computer would beep, and the menu bar would flash, when the alarm's set time was reached. It could also be used as an easier way to change/set the time and date on the computer. When opened, it would show the time and date set on the computer.
- Calculator: A basic calculator capable of addition, subtraction, multiplication, and division. It featured the basic 18 buttons for input.
- Control Panel: The control panel was used to adjust some of the settings on the computer. What made the original control panel unique from subsequent Mac OS control panels was the intended absence of any text. This was chosen to demonstrate the graphical user interface. Representation was achieved by using symbols. It could be used to adjust settings such as volume, double click speed, mouse sensitivity, and desktop background. On the Macintosh 128K, Macintosh 512K, Macintosh Plus, and Macintosh SE, the screen brightness was controlled by a mechanical adjustment wheel beneath the screen.
- Key Caps: A DA used to show the layout of the original Macintosh keyboard. It showed which special characters could be produced when normal keys were pressed along with modifier keys (Command, Shift, Option).
- Note Pad: A note-taking DA that would save text entered into it on the floppy disk. Multiple note pages could be accessed via the folded corner symbol in the bottom-left corner of the note page.
- Puzzle: A basic 1–15 slide puzzle, similar to the picture puzzle found in later versions of the Mac OS.
- Scrapbook: This DA was similar to a cut, copy, and paste library. It allowed the user to store text selections and graphics which could then be transferred to other applications.

== See also ==
- Apple v. Digital Research
- GEM/1
- Pirouette: Turning Points in Design
- Windows 1.0

Preceded by	System 1; 1984	Succeeded by System 2
