= Calculator (Apple) =

Calculator application on Apple systems

- Calculator app running on macOS Tahoe in Scientific mode
- Developer: Apple
- Release: 1984 (with System 1); 2001 (with Mac OS X 10.0); 2007 (with iPhone OS 1); 2015 (with watchOS 1); 2024 (with iPadOS 18)
- Stable release: macOS: 26 (Tahoe) iOS: 26 iPadOS: 26 watchOS: 26
- Operating system: Classic Mac OS, macOS, iOS, iPadOS, watchOS
- Type: Calculator
- Website: iOS: support.apple.com/en-us/guide/iphone/iph1ac0b5cc/ios macOS: https://support.apple.com/en-us/guide/calculator/welcome/mac

Calculator is a basic calculator application made by Apple and bundled with its macOS, iOS, iPadOS, and watchOS operating systems. It has three modes: basic, scientific, and programmer. The basic mode includes a number pad, buttons for adding, subtracting, multiplying, and dividing, as well as memory keys. Scientific mode supports exponents and trigonometric functions. The macOS version of Calculator also has a programmer mode that gives the user access to more options related to computer programming.

== History ==
The Mac OS Calculator as it shipped in 1984, with System 1

The Calculator program has a long associated history with the beginning of the Macintosh platform, where a simple four-function calculator program was a standard desk accessory from the earliest Mac operating system versions. Though no higher math capability was included, third-party developers provided upgrades, and Apple released the Graphing Calculator application with the first PowerPC release (7.1.2) of the Mac OS, and it was a standard component through Mac OS 9. Apple also ships a different application with macOS called Grapher for this purpose.

The Calculator appeared first as a desk accessory in first version of Macintosh System for the 1984 Macintosh 128K. Its original incarnation was developed by Chris Espinosa and its appearance was designed, in part, by Steve Jobs when Espinosa, flustered by Jobs's dissatisfaction with all of his prototype designs, conceived an application called The Steve Jobs Roll Your Own Calculator Construction Set that allowed Jobs to tailor the look of the calculator to his liking. Its design was maintained with the same basic math operations until the final release of classic Mac OS in 2001. Later versions pay tribute to Dieter Rams and the Braun design department, which influenced both Jobs and Apple designer Jonathan Ive. A Dashboard Calculator widget was included in all versions of macOS from Mac OS X Tiger onwards until Mojave, after which Dashboard was discontinued. It only has the basic mode of its desktop counterpart. With the release of OS X Yosemite, unit conversion functions were added to the Spotlight calculator, as well as a simple calculator widget available in the Notification Center.

A calculator function has been included with iOS since its launch on iPhone and iPod Touch. A native calculator function was added to the Apple Watch with watchOS 6, which included a dedicated button for calculating tips. The Calculator app was not available on Apple's iPad tablet until the release of iPadOS 18 in September 2024. In 2020, during an interview with tech YouTuber Marques Brownlee, Apple software chief Craig Federighi said the reason the iPad lacked a calculator app was because Apple's engineers had not found a design that would "do justice" to the iPad's screen size. In 2022, the Wall Street Journal's Joanna Stern asked Apple marketing chief Greg Joswiak about the lack of a Calculator app, who responded: "There are a ton of them. Go to the App Store." A jailbreak tweak named "Belfry" was able to unofficially install the app, along with every other iPhone-only application, on an iPad in early 2012. In 2024, Tim Cook announced that a Calculator app for iPad would be released as a part of iPadOS 18, with new features such as compatibility with the Apple Pencil.

== Features ==
Calculator has Reverse Polish notation support on macOS, and can also speak the buttons pressed and result returned.

The calculator also includes some basic conversion functions to convert between units in the following categories:

- Area
- Currency (exchange rates may be updated over the Internet)
- Energy or Work
- Temperature
- Length
- Speed
- Pressure
- Weight/Mass
- Power
- Volume

Since the release of Mac OS X Leopard, simple arithmetic functions can be calculated from the Spotlight feature. They include the standard addition, subtraction, multiplication, and division operations, with exponentiation and the use of the percent sign to denote percentage.
