= The Last Hope: Dead Zone Survival =

2023 video game

- The game's Nintendo eShop banner
- Developer: VG Games
- Publisher: VG Games
- Engine: Unity
- Platform: Nintendo Switch
- Release: June 30, 2023
- Genres: Survival, third-person shooter
- Mode: Single-player

The Last Hope: Dead Zone Survival is a survival game developed by VG Games for the Nintendo Switch. The game revolves around Brian Lee, a man who is sent to the future to investigate an inevitable zombie outbreak while accompanied by his daughter, Eva. The gameplay consists of killing zombies and collecting resources while exploring a city.

The game was released on June 30, 2023, and was poorly received by critics, who saw it as a knockoff of 2013's The Last of Us; The Last Hope's Eva was found to be highly reminiscent of The Last of Us's Ellie. Other common criticisms of the game included the use of deceptive advertising, frustrating gameplay, and launching with various bugs. The game was removed from the Nintendo eShop on August 1, 2023, and its trailers were taken down by Sony Interactive Entertainment. It has been used as an example of Nintendo eShop shovelware, and is considered one of the worst video games of 2023.

== Gameplay ==
The player, Brian Lee, shooting at a horde of zombies, with Eva cowering in the background

The gameplay of The Last Hope: Dead Zone Survival consists of killing zombies while exploring a post-apocalyptic city as protagonist Brian Lee. The player has a health bar and stamina bar, and can access four weapons throughout the game: a handgun, assault rifle, baseball bat, and craftable Molotov cocktail. The game features other objectives for the player to complete, such as lock picking. During these objectives, Brian Lee is accompanied by Eva. (Note: The game refers to the character as Eva and Eve interchangeably.) Close encounters with enemies will result in Eva running away and cowering, and she is unable to leave her cowering state until all zombies nearby are killed. If Eva dies, the player will be sent back to the last checkpoint. There is a limited amount of ammunition within the game, and the baseball bat will drain the player's stamina, which will not regenerate without the use of a limited item. As a result of this, mistakes made by the player may create an unwinnable situation.

=== Plot ===
In The Last Hope: Dead Zone Survival, a zombie outbreak is predicted to occur in the near future, which will wipe out 95% of the world population, infect 4%, and leave 1% to survive. To investigate this, a man named Brian Lee is sent to the future and wakes up in a hospital ward. After leaving the hospital and going to a library, he meets a girl cowering in the corner named Eva, who assures Brian that she is not infected, though she says she needs medicine from the pharmacy and that her mother is dead. Shortly after the two meet, Eva reveals that she is Brian's daughter from the future. Throughout the course of the game, Brian escorts Eva across the city while killing zombies. After traversing through the city and defeating the undead, they board a boat and depart safely.

== Development and release ==
The Last Hope was developed by Virtual Global Games (VG Games), a company based in Chișinău. The company is sometimes known as West Connection Limited. VG Games was noted before the creation of the game for creating low-quality Nintendo Switch games, such as Need for Drive – Car Racing and Gangster Life: Criminal Untold, Cars, Theft, Police. The Last Hope was released for the Nintendo eShop exclusively in the United Kingdom on June 30, 2023. An international release never occurred, and it is unknown if the game was planned to come to other regions.

The game's trailer went viral on YouTube and it received media coverage. According to TheGamer, the game reached thousands of downloads, possibly due to its low price point. The game was removed from the eShop on August 1 and its trailers were taken down shortly afterwards following copyright claims from Sony Interactive Entertainment.

== Reception ==
Eva's design was criticized for being plagiarized from the character design of Ellie from The Last of Us.

The Last Hope was released to a poor reception from critics. Several publications pointed out the game's plagiarized character designs. Kotaku referred to the game as the "dollar store" version of The Last of Us, pointing out that Eva wore the same outfit as Ellie and had a similar appearance. Chris McMullen of The Escapist likened her personality to that of a "rotting yak carcass". The gameplay was strongly criticized. John Linneman of Digital Foundry considered it the worst game he had ever played, citing the limited ammunition making some combat scenarios impossible, saved data being erased when skipping loading screens, and an inaccessible room due to the requirement of keyboard controls. McMullen also likened the game to torture, and James Stephanie Sterling described it as an "underhanded, slipshod piece of shit". McMullen criticized the clumsy writing, such as "you dead" (in all caps) in the game over screen, and Brian's line "Just like my yet to come daughter" upon meeting Eva.

The performance of the game was another common complaint. Digital Foundry pointed out numerous graphical and performance flaws, such as doors being able to crash the game, frame rate dips, and flickering shadows. These were cited by other publications to prove that the game used deceptive advertising on consumers, as the game's eShop description advertised a "captivating plot", "immersive graphics", and "meaningful choices". The game has been regarded as an example of an abundant shovelware problem on the Nintendo eShop, which has been noted to have a large variety of low-quality games. Kotaku argued that Nintendo needs to bring quality control to its storefront. Digital Foundry said The Last Hope is one of "depravity festering within certain corners of the industry", labeling the game as "scam", having "no redeeming features whatsoever". TheGamer attributed the uptick in sales on the Nintendo eShop as being the "morbid sense of curiosity" from consumers seeing the negative reception of the game in headlines, followed by immediately claiming that the game was a "garbage ripoff". Eurogamer's Victoria Kennedy humorously considered it an example of the joke "we have The Last of Us at home", referencing the opinion that The Last Hope is a low-quality copy of The Last of Us, and Eurogamer Germany wrote that a TV test pattern would be more entertaining to watch. It has been considered one of the worst games of 2023 by Kotaku and IGN.

== See also ==
- Calculator – another product cited when criticizing the eShop's quality control
