= Last Hope (manga) =

Manga series

- Cover of Last Hope vol. 1 (2005), art by Kriss Sison
- Genre: Action/adventure, humor/comedy, mystery
- Author: Michael Dignan
- Illustrator: Kriss Sison
- Publisher: Seven Seas Entertainment (United States)
- Original run: 2005–2006
- Volumes: 2

Last Hope is an original English-language manga series written by Michael Dignan, illustrated by Kriss Sison and published by Seven Seas Entertainment. Two volumes were published between 2005 and 2006. A third was planned but never released.

== Plot summary ==
Do you believe in alternate dimensions? Ikuko, her friend Colleen, and Alvin at Hawaii's Maunaloa Institute for International Studies become involved in an unusual situation when the Hiro, confesses to them that he's really a prince from another world on the run from the evil Lord Kumagai! Now that they've been dragged into it, Hiro, Ikuko, and their friends must traverse countless alternate dimensions and facing dangers; whether at the hands of the ruthless Lord Kumagai or the alternate dimensions' hostile inhabitants.

== Characters ==
- Hiroto "Hiro" Nakadai

An attractive, mysterious Maunaloa Institute for International Studies transfer student who's actually a prince from another world. His uncle, Lord Kumagai, murdered his parents and put the blame on him in an attempt to gain the crown. Now, armed with only a defective piece of dimension-hopping technology from his world, he must escape the pursuit of his murderous uncle and his foot soldiers, by traveling between dimensions searching out salvation or a way to reveal the truth and prove his innocence. He slowly begins to develop feelings for Ikuko during their travels.
Kriss Sison claims that Alvin was the easiest character to develop, giving rise to the inside joke that this is because the illustrator and the character are actually one and the same.

- Ikuko

A shy, naive student at Maunaloa Institute for International Studies with a huge crush on Hiro. Colleen is her best friend. She tries her best to be the emotional support for the group when times get rough. Ikuko has an inexplicable bond with Hiccup.
Sison says that Ikuko and Colleen are his favorite characters to draw.

- Colleen

An Irish student at Maunaloa Institute for International Studies with a penchant for caffeine. She's very blunt and tomboyish in her mannerisms but also has a special spunkiness that seems to attract much unwanted male attention; two examples being Drake and Alvin. She's somewhat of a realist and doesn't easily accept any of the dimension-hopping concepts, sometimes revealing an inability to cope with large amounts of stress.

- Drake

Maunaloa Institute for International Studies student, best friend of Tom's, and he has a huge crush on Colleen. He shows his emotions in an almost bullying way which makes him seem like a bad guy, but he's actually a very loyal man who'd do anything for his friends.

- Tom

Maunaloa Institute for International Studies student who's best friends with Drake. At first he's depicted as Drake's lackey, but his character develops into a very loyal friend with a bad temperament.

- Alvin

A German student at Maunaloa Institute for International Studies with a genius IQ and a crush on Colleen. He's a very shy and outspoken boy who wants nothing more than to fit in with his fellow students, resulting in purposely average grades despite his above average intelligence.

- Lord Kumagai

Hiro's uncle; he killed Hiro's parents and put the blame on Hiro so that he'd be on the run and defenseless. Now, with his army of foot soldiers, he aims to capture Hiro, murder him as well, and claim the throne.

- Hiccup

A cute, mysterious creature from Hiro's world with a tendency to hiccup, which is where he got his name. For some reason, he warms up to Ikuko almost immediately. He seems to be perpetually drunk.
Hiccup's design was originally going to be much more serious. Shiei assisted Kriss Sison in developing the Hiccup we know today.

- Sturch

The kind and caring principal of Maunaloa Institute for International Studies. While visiting the Alternate School dimension, the group runs into an evil version of him. In that dimension, he is a murderous man who runs his school with an iron fist as well as with iron bars.

- Captain Lisbeth Striker

While visiting the Mech World, the gang runs into this woman, who is among the few surviving humans in the year 2324. Given the world she grew up in, she's very rugged and overly trusting of humans. She's cool under pressure and is very skilled at combat both with and without the aid of a mech.

- Elizabeth

We meet her very briefly at the end of the second volume when the gang escapes the Mech World. She seems to reside in the Swiss countryside near the city of Bern at the "House of Frankenstein". She is very sweet and caring, even to strangers. Her clothing and mannerisms lead us to believe that her world exists in the past.

== Worlds ==
Well over 5,000 worlds have already been mapped out and categorized by the creators of the dimension-hopping devices (Absprung and Himmelskarte) of Hiro's World. Some have been quarantined and others marked for recommendation; research of new worlds continues today. Read the official article, "Report on the Sociological and Economic Implications of Trans-Dimensional Travel for Trade and Cultural Exchange" for more information on these devices and their dimension-hopping abilities.

- Earth

The base world where all the main characters reside. They attend Maunaloa Institute for International Studies in Hawaii; this world is just like ours.

- Hiro's World

Where Hiro, Lord Kumagai, and Hiccup originally resided. It can be assumed that it's a world under a monarchy because Hiro is a prince and his uncle is a Lord. Judging by Hiro's knowledge and abilities, it's assumed that intelligence and physical prowess are prized skills here because both Lord Kumagai and Hiro are skilled in combat with and without weapons, though their weapons of choice are swords. (Perhaps a role resembling a samurai is highly regarded or expected of royalty?) The world is also obviously technologically advanced because of the presence of the Absprung and Himmelskarte; dimension-hopping devices.

- Alternate School

The first world the gang visits; first-second volume. This world mirrors Maunaloa Institute for International Studies almost exactly, including its students and staff. The difference is that in this world, the school more closely resembles a zero-tolerance prison in which discipline, torture, and taking pleasure in pain is the norm. The school is lined with guards who would kill you soon as look at you, head by a principle who makes examples of delinquent students by murdering them in front of their classmates, and populated by a student body full of fear and hoping for freedom. No one is permitted in or out of the facility.

- Mech World

The second world the gang visits; second volume. It's the year 2324 and humanity had discovered life on Mars, only to have that very life they found track them back to Earth. The aliens, named Scavengers, systematically assimilated human technologies and slaughtered humans in waves, leaving mere thousands left who all take residence on the moon in an attempt to escape. Of course, this didn't stop the Scavengers who followed the humans to the moon. Residing in an underground safe haven away from the Scavengers, the humans get to work on their last hope, the Trimech (TMH-1A).

- House of Frankenstein

The third world the gang visits; second volume. This world seems to exist in the past somewhere in the Swiss countryside near a city named Bern. Because this world was only introduced for a brief two pages before the epilogue of the second volume, knowledge of this world is limited.

== Volume three ==
In the late 2000s, on the official site's forums, Seven Seas Entertainment staff wrote that a concluding third volume would be published, most likely in the form of a collective omnibus to introduce new readers to the worlds of Last Hope. A 31-page preview was released. Seven Seas Entertainment also released the following statement:

The delay with Last Hope Vol. 3 was purely due to a contractual issue that arose between Last Hope's writer and Seven Seas. It is our hope that we will be able to continue with production on Last Hope at some point in the future, but with the manga market in a very different place today than it was when the series launched back in 2005, and many of today's readers are also not familiar with the first two volumes as two years have come and gone since volume 2 hit bookstore shelves. It is our hope that we'll be able to reintroduce the series to today's readers and be able to bring fans a conclusion to the series.
