= Grassroots innovation =

Bottom-up solution development

Grassroots Innovation is the voluntary generation and development of innovations by any member of an organization, regardless of function or seniority.

It is considered a form of bottom-up innovation (see Top-down and bottom-up design), whereby innovation resides 'deep in the bowels' of an organization, i.e., it is seen as a responsibility of all members of an organization.

== Advantages ==
Grassroots innovation offers several benefits to companies:

- Caters to employees' need for self-determination, boosting their intrinsic motivation
- Leverages the creativity of employees that would otherwise not contribute to innovation efforts
- Helps employees learn how to generate, mature and implement innovation ideas
- Stimulates networking and connections among employees who may not often work together
- Leverages cross-functional synergies and frontline knowledge to generate more customer-centric innovations

== Risks ==
Grassroots innovation is, however, associated with two important risks:

- Higher autonomy means employees may drift from firm-wide goals
- High coordination costs, which means that without a careful process design, companies may become disappointed with the results
- Hard to keep all ideators motivated and properly incentivized

== Other uses of the term ==
Researchers in the fields of sustainability and technology have used the term grassroots innovation to refer to "a network of activists and organizations generating novel bottom-up solutions for sustainable development and sustainable consumption; solutions that respond to the local situation and the interests and values of the communities involved", or as innovations generated by economically disadvantaged people who find practical and creative solutions for the needs of people at the bottom of the pyramid. These definitions are logically consistent with the definition above but refer to the society or community as the macro-unit of analysis, rather than a firm or organization. As such, they are a direct manifestation of the broader concept of grassroots movements in society.
