= Calcpad =

Bulgarian open source math software

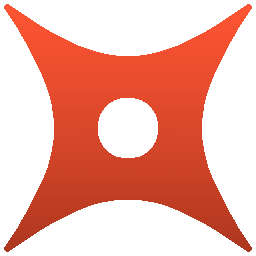

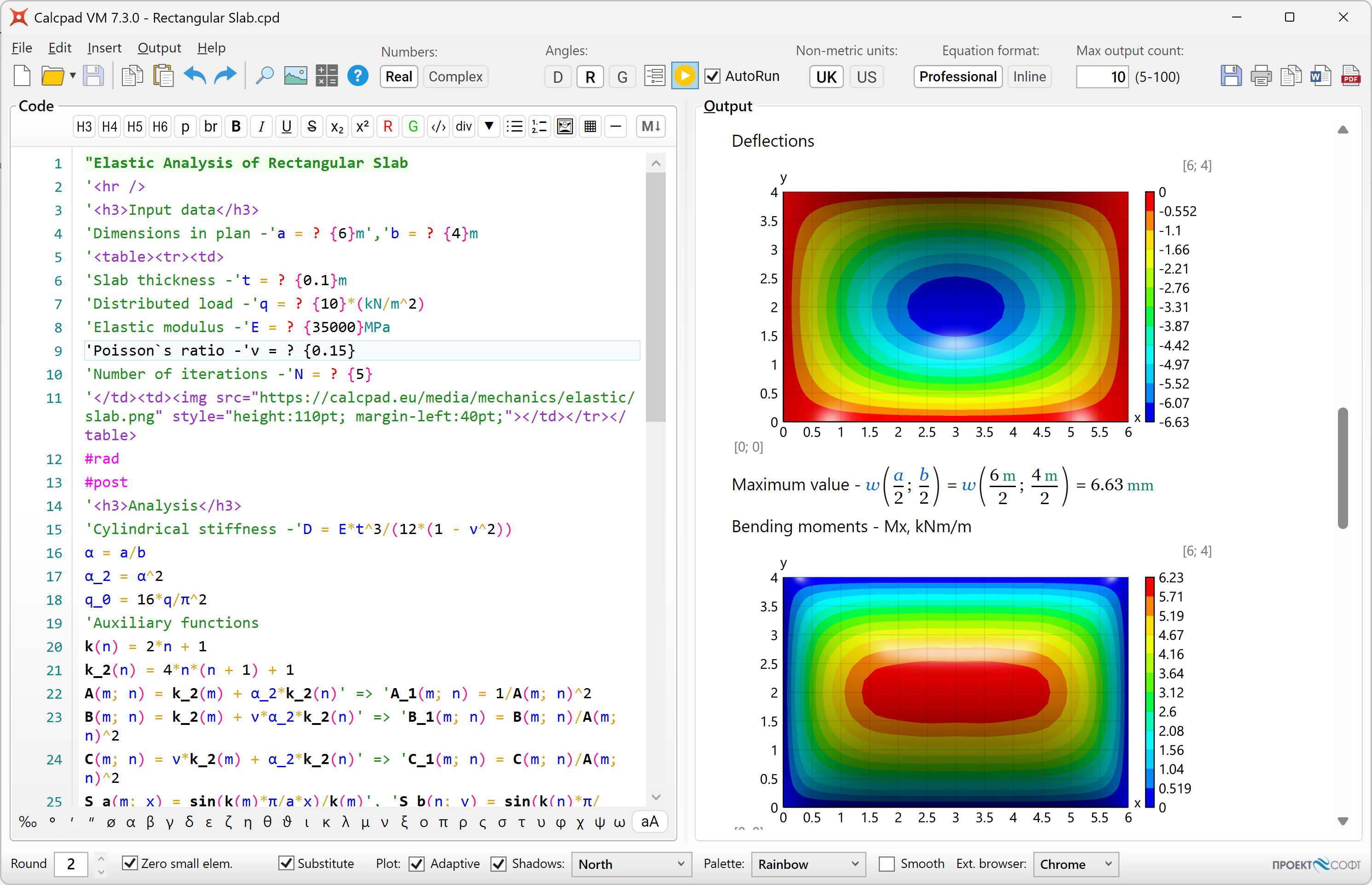
- Original author: Nedelcho Ganchovski
- Developer: Proektsoft EOOD
- Stable release: 7.7.2 / August 31, 2026; 8 days ago
- Written in: C#
- Operating system: Windows, Linux, Web
- Platform: Microsoft .NET 10
- Available in: English, Chinese, Bulgarian
- Type: Mathematical software Programming language
- License: MIT
- Website: https://calcpad.eu/

Calcpad is a free and open source mathematical software, created by PhD Eng. Nedelcho Ganchovski in 2014. It is primarily designed to perform engineering calculations and document the results into calculation notes/reports in HTML, PDF or Microsoft Word format. Calcpad employs its own programming language with simplified syntax, suitable for engineers with minimal programming experience.

== Features ==
The math engine offers a range of features, including calculation with real and complex numbers, units of measurement, custom variables, functions and macros, numerical methods for interpolation, root finding, function extrema, numerical differentiation and integration, vector and matrix calculations, plotting etc. It supports reading and writing external data from and to text and CSV files and Excel spreadsheets. Calcpad is widely used in practical engineering and education.

The programming language is interpreted with partial compilation (to IL) of repeatedly executed code, like functions and loop bodies. It includes simple program flow control structures like conditions and loops. The program code can be organized across multiple files (modules). Calcpad can interact with Python through a dedicated programming interface. With the help of an extra plugin, developed by Damian Pacheco in 2025, the Calcpad language can be used inside Grasshopper/Rhino.

Calcpad allows generation of HTML forms for data input. Text entries in code must be enclosed in quotes, and everything outside is assumed to be math equations. Text formatting can be performed by either Markdown or HTML/CSS. The results are automatically documented into HTML reports. With the help of JavaScript the report content can be made dynamic and interactive. Users can also create parametric vector drawings and even animations, by plugging Calcpad variables into the coordinates of SVG elements. The output can be exported also to PDF or DOCX files for Microsoft Word.

== Code examples ==
Source code of a sample computer program for analysis of a simply supported beam:

"Analysis of a simply supported beam"
'Length -'L = 6m
#if L ≤ 0m
    '<p class="err">Invalid value:'L'</p>
    #break
#end if
'Load -'q = 10kN/m^2
'<!--'PlotHeight = 100'-->
'Shear force -'V_0 = q*L/2
V(x) = V_0 - q*x
$Plot{V(x) @ x = 0m : L}
'Bending -'M_max = q*L^2/8
M(x) = V_0*x - q*x^2/2
$Plot{-M(x) @ x = 0m : L}

== See also ==
- Mathematical software
- MATLAB
- Mathematica
- Mathcad
