= Scientific calculator =

Calculator designed to calculate problems in science, engineering, and mathematics

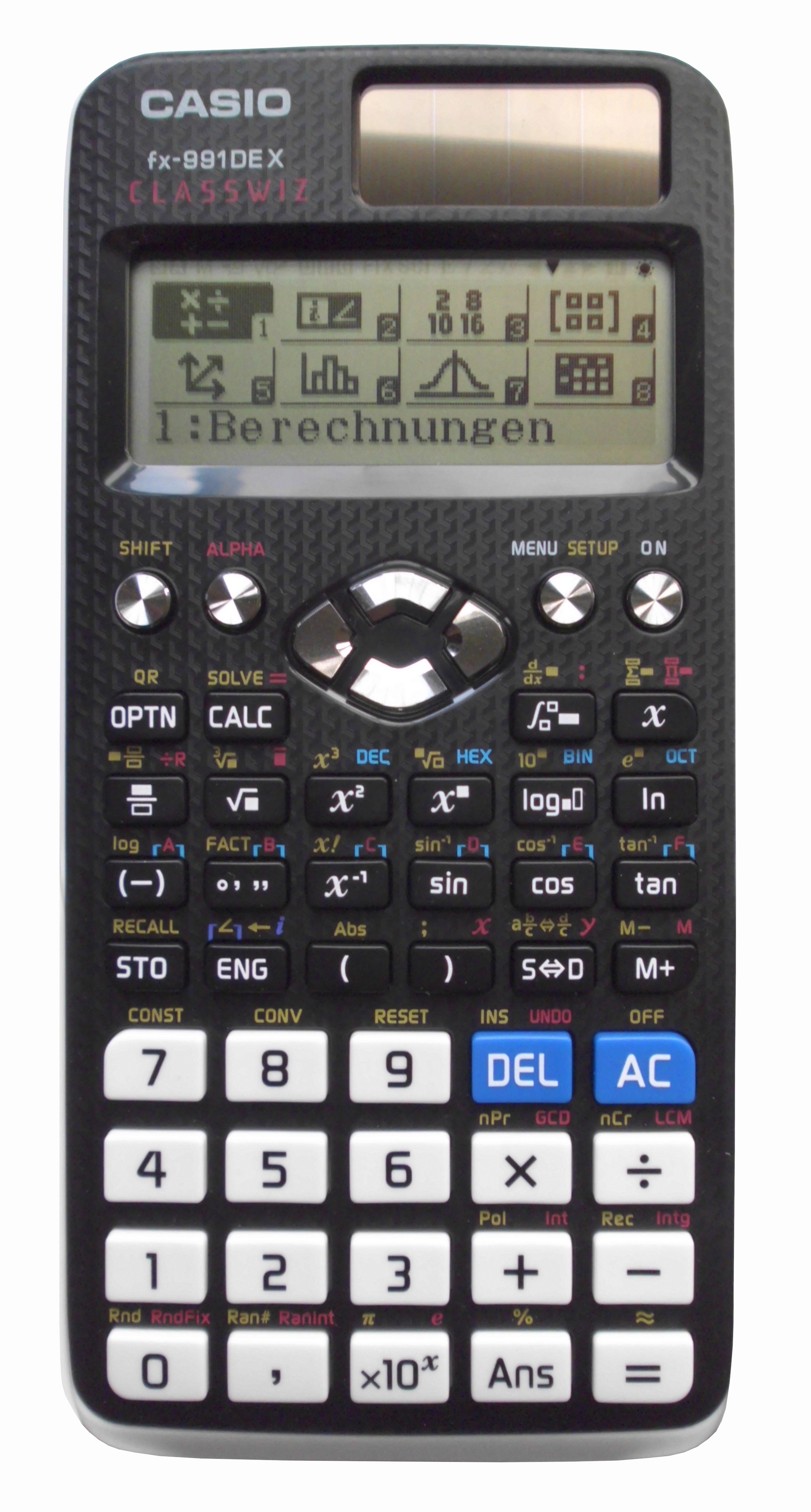
Casio fx-991DE X - a modern digital calculator from Casio with a dot matrix "Natural Textbook" LCD

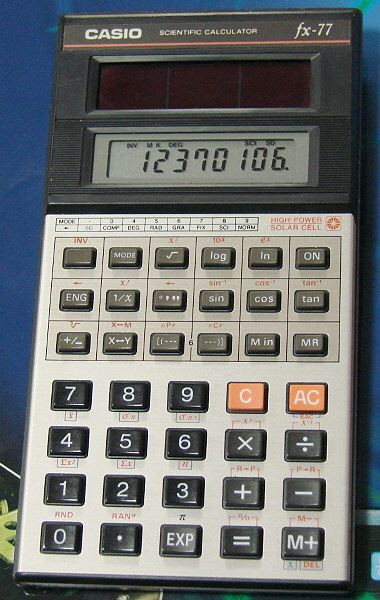
Casio fx-77, a solar-powered digital calculator from the 1980s using a single-line LCD

A scientific calculator is an electronic calculator, either desktop or handheld, designed to perform calculations using basic (addition, subtraction, multiplication, division) and advanced (trigonometric, hyperbolic, etc.) mathematical operations and functions. They have completely replaced slide rules as well as books of mathematical tables and are used in both educational and professional settings.

In some areas of study and professions scientific calculators have been replaced by graphing calculators and financial calculators which have the capabilities of a scientific calculator along with the capability to graph input data and functions, as well as by numerical computing, computer algebra, statistical, and spreadsheet software packages running on personal computers. Both desktop and mobile software calculators can also emulate many functions of a physical scientific calculator. Standalone scientific calculators remain popular in secondary and tertiary education because computers and smartphones are often prohibited during exams to reduce the likelihood of cheating.

== Functions ==
When electronic calculators were originally marketed they normally had only four or five capabilities (addition, subtraction, multiplication, division and square root). Modern scientific calculators generally have many more capabilities than the original four- or five-function calculator, and the capabilities differ between manufacturers and models.

The capabilities of a modern scientific calculator include:

- Scientific notation
- Floating-point decimal arithmetic
- Logarithmic functions, using both base 10 and base e
- Trigonometric functions (some including hyperbolic trigonometry)
- Exponential functions and roots beyond the square root
- Quick access to constants such as π and e

In addition, high-end scientific calculators generally include some or all of the following:

- Cursor controls to edit equations and view previous calculations (some calculators such as the LCD-8310, badge engineered under both Olympia and United Office keep the number of the previous result on-screen for convenience while the new calculation is being entered.)
- Hexadecimal, binary, and octal calculations, including basic Boolean mathematics
- Complex numbers
- Fractions calculations
- Statistics and probability calculations
- Programmability — see Programmable calculator
- Equation solving and computer algebra
- Matrix calculations
- Calculus
- Letters that can be used for spelling words or including variables into an equation
- Conversion of units
- Physical constants
- Vector calculations
- Random number generation

While most scientific calculators have traditionally used a single-line display similar to traditional pocket calculators, many of them have more digits (10 to 12), sometimes with extra digits for the floating-point exponent. A few have multi-line displays, with some models from Hewlett-Packard, Texas Instruments (both US manufacturers), Casio, Sharp, and Canon (all three Japanese makers) using dot matrix displays similar to those found on graphing calculators.

== Uses ==
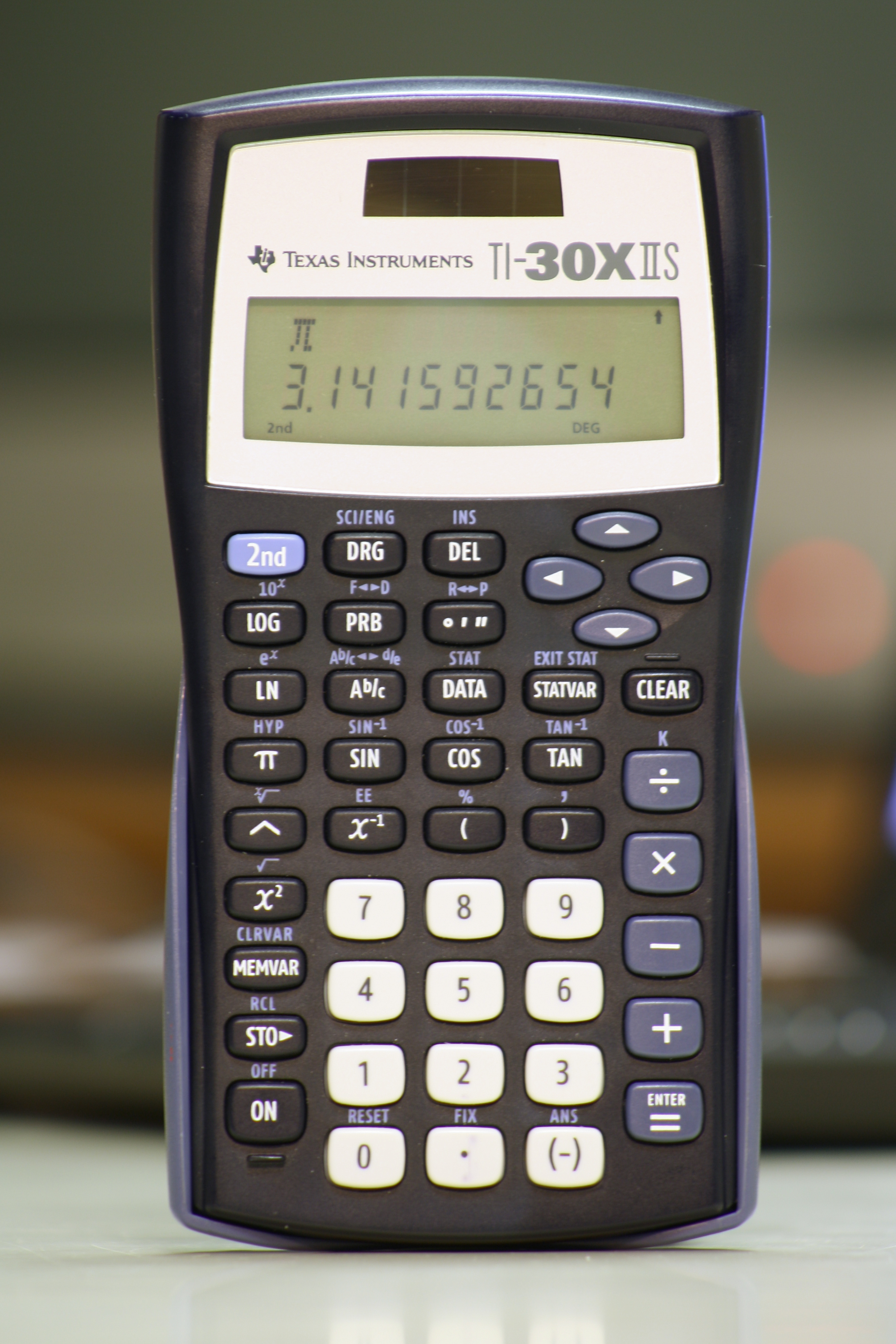
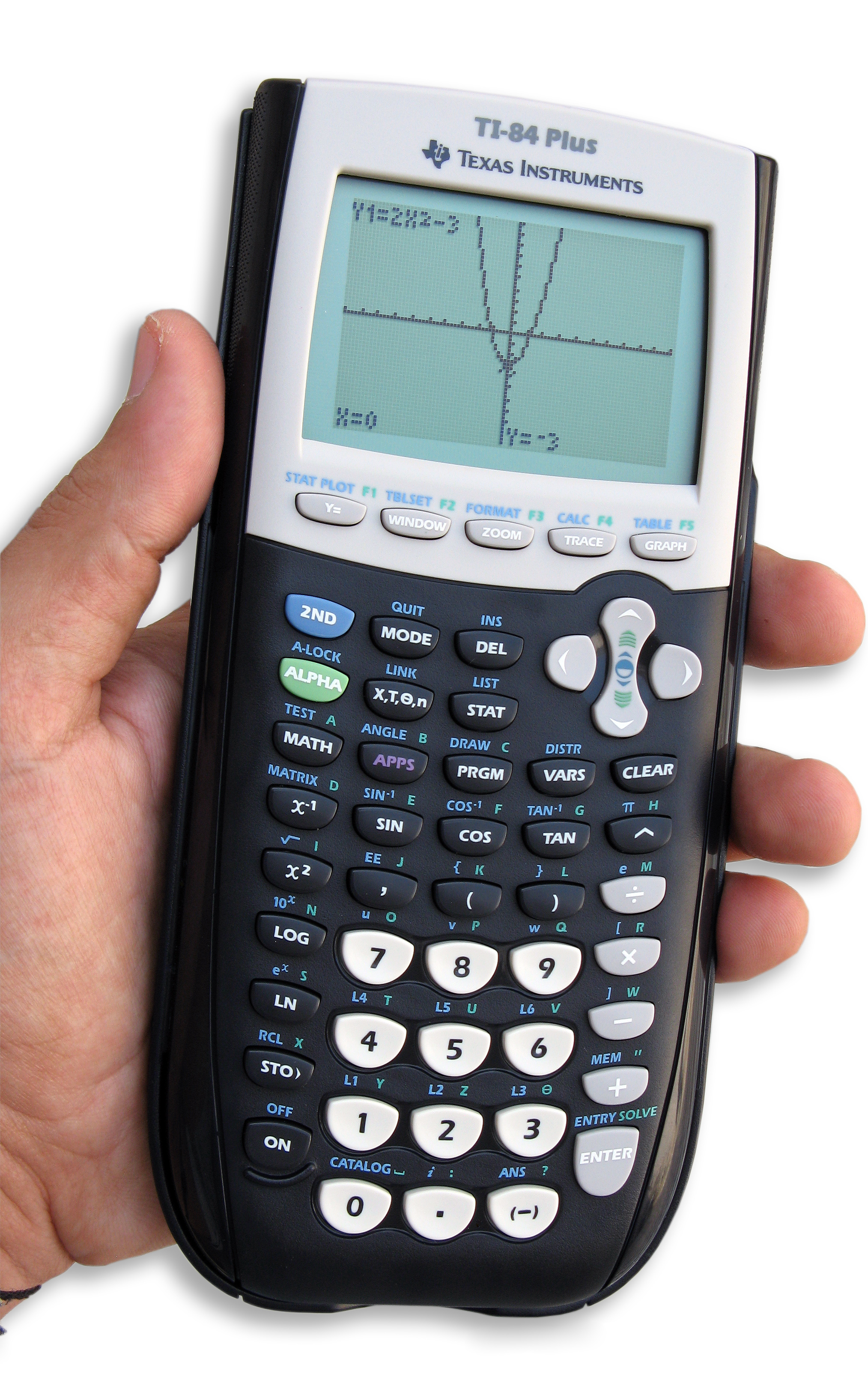
Left: Texas Instruments TI-30X IIS calculator with a two-tier LCD. The upper dot-matrix area can display input formulae and symbols.
Right: The TI-84 Plus—a typical graphing calculator by Texas Instruments

Scientific calculators are used widely in situations that require quick access to certain mathematical functions, especially those that were once looked up in mathematical tables, such as trigonometric functions, logarithms, or probability distributions. They are also used for calculations of very large or very small numbers, as in some aspects of astronomy, physics, and chemistry.

They are very often required for math classes from the junior high school level through college, and are generally either permitted or required on many standardized tests covering math and science subjects; as a result, many are sold into educational markets to cover this demand, and some high-end models include features making it easier to translate a problem on a textbook page into calculator input, e.g. by providing a method to enter an entire problem in as it is written on the page using simple formatting tools.

== History ==
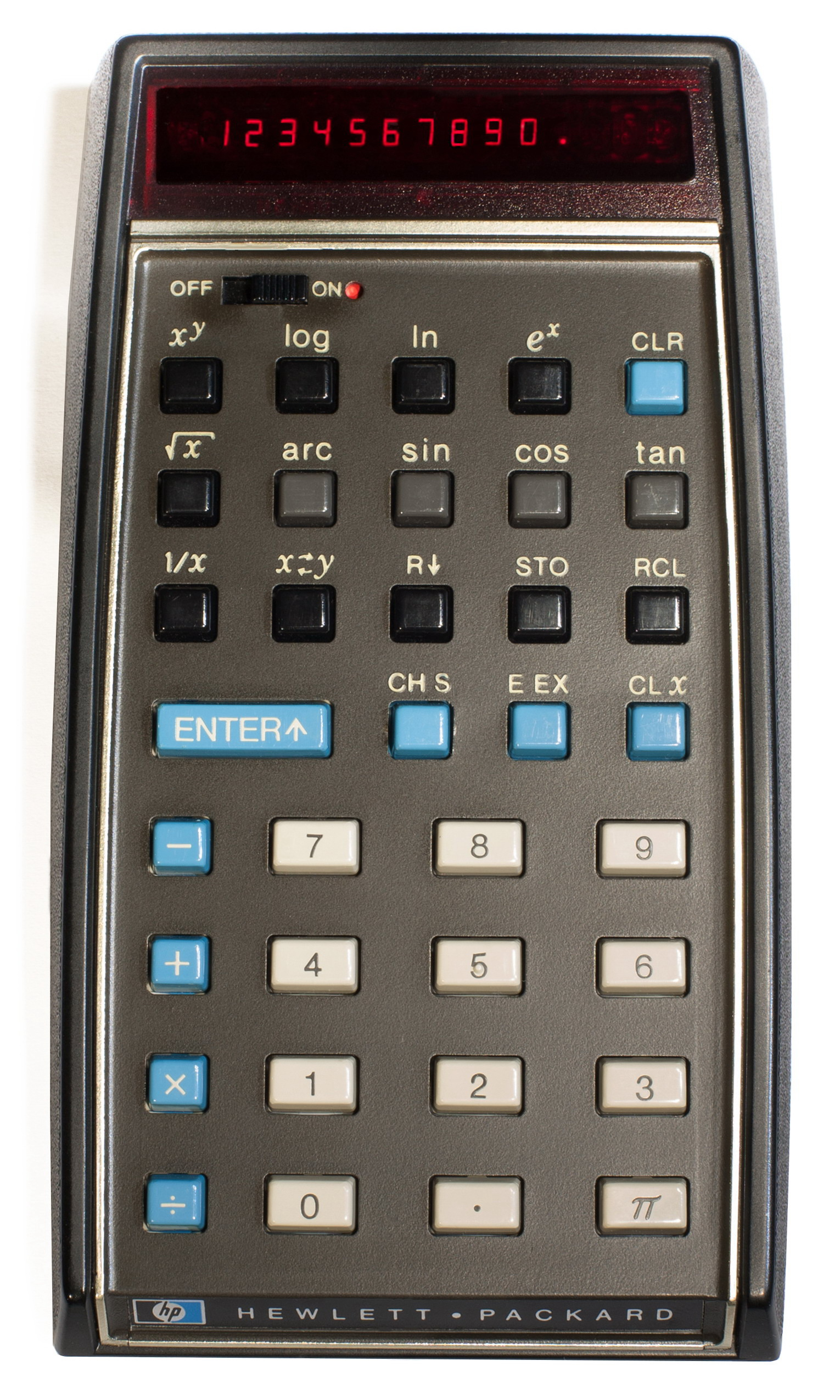
HP-35, the world's first scientific pocket calculator, was introduced in 1972 by Hewlett-Packard. It used reverse Polish notation and an LED display.

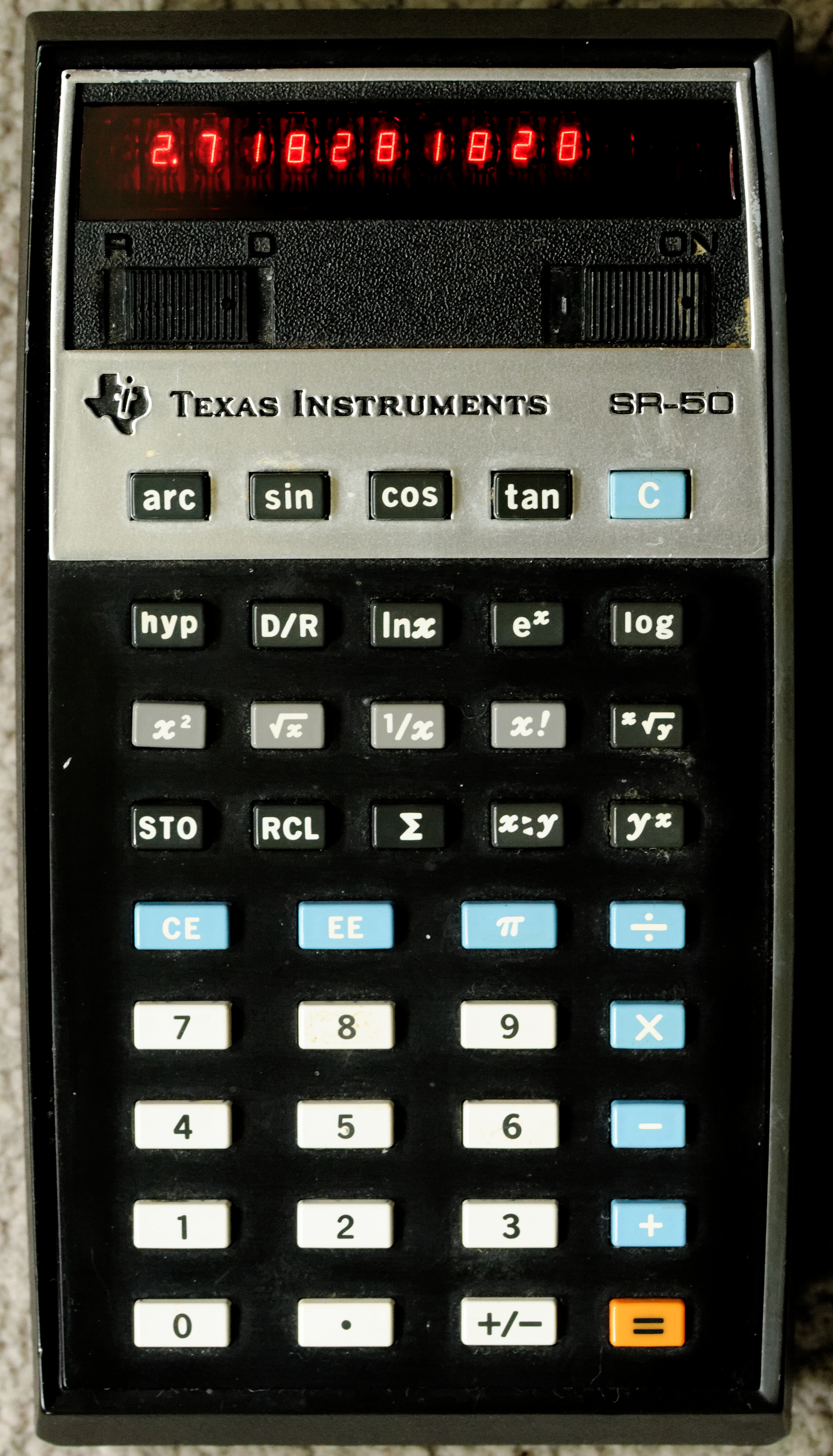
TI SR-50

The first scientific calculator that included all of the basic ideas above was the programmable Hewlett-Packard HP-9100A, released in 1968, though the Wang LOCI-2 and the Mathatronics Mathatron had some features later identified with scientific calculator designs. The HP-9100 series was built entirely from discrete transistor logic with no integrated circuits, and was one of the first uses of the CORDIC algorithm for trigonometric computation in a personal computing device, as well as the first calculator based on reverse Polish notation (RPN) entry. HP became closely identified with RPN calculators from then on, and even today some of their high-end calculators (particularly the long-lived HP-12C financial calculator and the HP-48 series of graphing calculators) still offer RPN as their default input mode due to having garnered a very large following.

The HP-35, introduced on February 1, 1972, was Hewlett-Packard's first pocket calculator and the world's first handheld scientific calculator. Like some of HP's desktop calculators it used RPN. Introduced at US$395, the HP-35 was available from 1972 to 1975.

Texas Instruments (TI), after the production of several units with scientific notation, introduced a handheld scientific calculator on January 15, 1974, in the form of the SR-50. TI's long-running TI-30 series being one of the most widely used scientific calculators in classrooms.

Casio, Canon, and Sharp, produced their graphing calculators, with Casio's FX series (beginning with the Casio FX-1 in 1972). Casio was the first company to produce a Graphing calculator (Casio fx-7000G).

== See also ==
- Calculator input methods – Ways in which keystrokes are interpreted
- Formula calculator – Software calculator that can evaluate expressions
- Mathematical software – Software used in mathematical applications
- Software calculators – Calculator as a computer program
