= NuCalc =

Graphing calculator software

NuCalc (Graphing Calculator)
- Graphing Calculator Viewer for Mac OS icon
- Graphing Calculator 4.0 under Mac OS X 10.7.4
- Developer: Pacific Tech
- Stable release: 5.2
- Operating system: Windows, OS X, iOS
- Type: Plotting
- License: Proprietary
- Website: pacifict.com

NuCalc, also known as Graphing Calculator, is a computer software tool made by Pacific Tech. It can graph inequalities and vector fields, and functions in two, three, or four dimensions. It supports several different coordinate systems, and can solve equations. It runs on OS X as Graphing Calculator, and on Windows.

== History ==
The Graphing Calculator 1.0 software was bundled with all Power Macintosh computers since its introduction in 1994. Having shipped on more than 20 million machines, it is the most familiar version of the program. This version of Graphing Calculator was secretly developed at Apple by Ron Avitzur, a contractor who felt obligated to complete the project, and their friend and colleague Greg Robbins. In 2005, This American Life featured Avitzur's story in episode 284, "Should I Stay or Should I Go?".

The app has been ported from C++ to SwiftUI.

== See also ==
- Grapher — Apple's replacement is included with Mac OS X 10.4
