= Grapher =

Graphing calculator software bundled with macOS

- Grapher running on macOS Big Sur
- Stable release: 2.8
- Operating system: macOS

Grapher is a computer program bundled with macOS since version 10.4 that is able to create 2D and 3D graphs from simple and complex equations. It includes a variety of samples ranging from differential equations to 3D-rendered Toroids and Lorenz attractors. It is also capable of dealing with functions and compositions of them. One can edit the appearance of graphs by changing line colors, adding patterns to rendered surfaces, adding comments, and changing the fonts and styles used to display them. Grapher is able to create animations of graphs by changing constants or rotating them in space.

== History ==
Before Grapher and Mac OS X, Mac OS 9 was bundled with Pacific Tech's Graphing Calculator, a similar program to Grapher that had been included with System 7. No versions of Mac OS X prior to Mac OS X v10.4 included a bundled graphing calculator application. On July 22, 2004, Apple bought Arizona Software's "Curvus Pro X," and renamed it “Graphing Calculator”, before deciding on “Grapher”. The news was publicly announced on September 15, 2004 at AppleInsider.

Version 2.0 of Grapher was bundled with Mac OS X v10.5, and version 2.1 with Mac OS X v10.6. It was notable for being one of the few applications bundled with 10.6 to ship without 64-bit support. As of OS X 10.9, it became a 64-bit application.

== Features ==
Grapher is a graphing calculator capable of creating 2D graphs including classic (linear-linear), polar coordinates, linear-logarithmic, log-log, and polar log, as well as 3D graphs including standard system, cylindrical system, and spherical system. Grapher is a Cocoa application which takes advantage of Mac OS X APIs. It also supports multiple equations in one graph and exporting equations to LaTeX format, and comes with several pre-made equation examples. It is one of the few sophisticated graphing programs available capable of easily exporting clean vector art for use in printed documents, but exporting 3D graphs to vector is not possible. Animation of graphs is also supported in both 2D and 3D, generating a QuickTime file.

It is also possible to use the operating system's copy-and-paste feature to copy equations from the application's visual equation editor. By doing so, Grapher functions as something of an equation editor; the user may copy images, EPS, PDF or LaTeX versions of entered equations into other applications. Any equation can be entered and copied; it is not limited to plottable equations.
