= List of free and open-source software packages =

This is a list of free and open-source software (FOSS) packages, computer software licensed under free software licenses and open-source licenses. Software that fits the Free Software Definition may be more appropriately called free software; the GNU project in particular objects to their works being referred to as open-source. For more information about the philosophical background for open-source software, see free software movement and Open Source Initiative. However, nearly all software meeting the Free Software Definition also meets the Open Source Definition and vice versa. A small fraction of the software that meets either definition is listed here. Some of the open-source applications are also the basis of commercial products, shown in the List of commercial open-source applications and services.

== Artificial intelligence ==
=== Agentic AI ===
- Auto-GPT — open-source autonomous goal-driven AI agent framework
- CrewAI — software framework and platform for building AI agents
- Hermes Agent — self-improving AI agent developed by Nous Research
- LangChain — software framework for developing applications and agents powered by large language models
- OpenClaw — agentic AI designed to perform tasks on a user's computer
- Warp – agentic development environment combining a terminal, integrated coding agent, and CLI.

=== AI-assisted software development ===
- Cline – AI coding agent for IDEs and the command line.
- Codex CLI – AI coding agent and command-line interface developed by OpenAI.
- Command Code — CLI and desktop AI agent
- DeepSeek Coder – large language model designed for code generation and AI-assisted software development.
- Eclipse Theia – integrated development environment and framework with AI-assisted software development features.
- goose – AI coding agent for the desktop and command line.
- Kilo Code — CLI and IDE extension developed by Anaconda
- OpenCode — CLI, desktop app, web app, and IDE extensions
- OpenHands — AI software development agent
- Oh My Pi – terminal-based AI coding agent developed as a fork of Pi.
- Pi – terminal-based AI coding agent.
- Zed – source-code editor with integrated AI-assisted development and agentic coding features.

=== General AI ===
- OpenCog – project that aims to build an artificial general intelligence (AGI) framework. OpenCog Prime is a specific set of interacting components designed to give rise to human-equivalent artificial general intelligence.

=== Language models ===
- Apertus – Swiss National AI Initiative LLM
- BERT – Google LLM
- BLOOM – BigScience multilingual LLM
- Cerebras-GPT – Cerebras Systems LLMs
- DeepSeek – R1 and V3 models
- Gemma 4 – Google LLM
- GLM-4.5 and later versions – Z.ai LLMs
- GPT-1, GPT-2, and GPT-OSS – OpenAI LLMs
- GPT-J, GPT-Neo, and GPT-NeoX – EleutherAI LLMs
- Hy – Tencent open-weight LLM
- Granite – IBM LLMs
- Grok-1 – xAI LLM
- Inkling – Thinking Machines
- Kimi (some versions) – Moonshot AI LLMs
- MiMo (some versions) – Xiaomi LLMs
- Mistral (some versions)
- Muse Glimmer — Meta Superintelligence Labs LLM
- Nemotron 3 – Nvidia open-weight models
- OLMo – Allen Institute for AI LLM
- Phi – Microsoft LLMs
- Qwen (some versions) – Alibaba Cloud LLMs
- Sarvam-M, Sarvam-105B and Sarvam-30B – Sarvam AI LLMs
- SmolLM – Hugging Face small language models (SLMs)
- Step-3.7Flash – StepFun LLM
- T5 – Google LLM
- XLNet – Google LLM

=== Computer vision ===
- AForge.NET – computer vision, artificial intelligence and robotics library for the .NET framework
- OpenCV – computer vision library in C++
- Point Cloud Library – library for point cloud processing

=== Machine learning ===
- Accord.NET
- Apache Mahout
- Apache Spark MLlib
- Apache SystemDS
- CatBoost
- Dlib
- ELKI
- fastText
- Gensim
- H_{2}O
- Infer.NET
- Jubatus
- KNIME
- LIBSVM
- LightGBM
- Massive Online Analysis
- ML.NET
- mlpack
- MLX (Apple)
- Orange
- PyMC
- Scikit-learn
- Scikit-multiflow
- Shogun
- Vowpal Wabbit
- Weka
- XGBoost

==== Deep learning ====
- Apache SINGA
- BigDL
- Caffe
- Chainer
- Deeplearning4j
- DeepSpeed
- Dlib
- fastai
- Flux
- Horovod
- Hugging Face Transformers
- JAX
- Keras
- Microsoft Cognitive Toolkit
- MindSpore
- MXNet
- OpenNN
- OpenVINO
- PlaidML
- PyTorch
- PyTorch Lightning
- TensorFlow
- Theano
- Torch

=== Planning ===
- TREX – reactive planning

=== Robotics ===
- ArduPilot
- CoppeliaSim
- Gazebo
- Mobile Robot Programming Toolkit
- OpenRTM-aist
- Paparazzi Project
- Player Project
- Python Robotics
- Robot Operating System (ROS)
- TurtleBot
- UBtech Thinker
- Webots – robot simulator

==== Autonomous vehicles and drones ====
- ArduPilot
- LibrePilot
- Openpilot
- Paparazzi Project
- PX4 autopilot

== Assistive technology ==
=== Speech (synthesis and recognition) ===
- CMU Sphinx – speech recognition software from Carnegie Mellon University
- Emacspeak – audio desktop
- ESpeak – compact software speech synthesizer for English and other languages
- Festival Speech Synthesis System – general multilingual speech synthesis
- Modular Audio Recognition Framework – voice, audio, speech NLP processing
- NonVisual Desktop Access (NVDA) – screen reader for Windows
- Text2Speech – Text-To-Speech (TTS) Software
- Orca – screen reader for Linux

=== Other assistive technology ===
- Dasher – unique text input software
- Gnopernicus – AT suite for GNOME 2
- Virtual Magnifying Glass – multi-platform screen magnification tool

== CAD ==
- Archimedes (CAD)
- Art of Illusion
- Blender
- BRL-CAD – constructive solid geometry (CSG) solid modeling computer-aided design (CAD) system
- FreeCAD – parametric 3D CAD modeler with a focus on mechanical engineering, BIM, and product design
- LeoCAD — beginner Lego 3D modeler
- LibreCAD – 2D CAD software using AutoCAD-like interface and file format
- MakeHuman
- MeshLab
- Open Cascade Technology (OCCT) – CAD kernel for 3D CAD, CAM, CAE
- OpenSCAD – scripting-based 3D CAD software
- QCAD
- SolveSpace – 2D and 3D CAD, constraint-based parametric modeler with simple mechanical simulation abilities
- Sweet Home 3D
- Wings 3D

=== Computer-aided engineering (CAE) ===
- Advanced Simulation Library
- ASCEND
- DWSIM
- Elmer FEM solver
- Gmsh
- LibreCAD
- MapleSim
- Modelica
- OpenSim
- OpenFOAM
- Project Chrono
- Salome
- SimScale
- SU2 code
- xeokit

=== Computer-aided manufacturing (CAM) ===
==== Subtractive ====
- LinuxCNC
- FreeCAD

==== Additive Manufacturing ====
- Cura
- Slic3r
- MeshLab
- OctoPrint
- Marlin
- Klipper
- Repetier-Host
- AstroPrint

=== Electronic design automation (EDA) ===
- Electric
- FreePCB
- Fritzing – CAD software for the design of electronics hardware to build more permanent circuits from prototypes
- gEDA
- GNU Circuit Analysis Package (Gnucap)
- Icarus Verilog
- KiCad – suite for electronic design automation (EDA) for schematic capture, PCB layout, manufacturing file viewing, SPICE simulation, and engineering calculation
- KTechLab
- Magic
- Ngspice
- pcb-rnd
- Oregano
- Quite Universal Circuit Simulator (QUCS)
- Verilator
- XCircuit

== Computer simulation ==
- Blender – 3D computer graphics software toolset used for creating animated films, visual effects, art, 3D printed models, and motion graphics
- FreeCAD – equivalent of Blender geared toward mechanical engineers
- OpenFOAM – software used for computational fluid dynamics (or CFD)
- FlightGear – atmospheric and orbital flight simulator with a flight dynamics engine (JSBSim) that was used in a 2015 NASA benchmark to judge new simulation code to space industry standards
- SimPy – queue-theoretic event-based simulator written in Python
- Salome – generic platform for Pre- and Post-Processing for numerical simulation

== Cypherpunk software ==
=== Cryptography and Privacy Software ===
- OpenPGP – open-source version of Pretty Good Privacy
- GNU Privacy Guard – replacement for PGP
- OpenSSL – library for applications that provide secure communications over computer networks
- NaCl (software) – crypto library
- Libsodium – fork of NaCl
- VeraCrypt – disk encryption software forked from TrueCrypt
- LUKS – standard for disk encryption on Linux systems
- Nym (mixnet) – mix network that uses noise and random packet timing for obfsucation, overlay network for NymVPN
- Tor (network) – free overlay network for enabling anonymous communication
- Tails (operating system) – security-focused Linux distro using Tor by default
- Signal (software) – secure messaging app
- Off-the-Record Messaging – protocol for secure instant messaging
- GPGTools – macOS suite for GnuPG-based encryption

=== Hacking and Network Security Tools ===
- Aircrack-ng – Wi-Fi security auditing tool
- BackTrack – predecessor to Kali Linux
- Burp Suite Community Edition – security assessment and penetration testing of web applications
- Ghidra – software reverse engineering suite developed by the NSA
- Hashcat – password recovery utility
- High Orbit Ion Cannon – DDoS
- hping3 — packet crafting and network penetration-testing utility
- Hydra (software) – login cracker supporting numerous protocols
- John the Ripper – password cracking tool
- Kali Linux – penetration testing Linux distribution
- Metasploit Project – framework for developing and executing exploit code
- Netcat – network utility for reading/writing data across networks
- Nikto (vulnerability scanner) – web server vulnerability scanner
- Nmap – network scanning, port scanner, and auditing tool
- OpenSSH – implementation of the SSH protocol
- Radare2 – reverse engineering framework
- Snort (software) – network intrusion detection system
- sqlmap – automated SQL injection and database takeover tool
- Suricata (software) – network threat detection engine
- Volatility (memory forensics) – memory forensics framework for incident response
- Wireshark – network protocol analyzer
- YARA – tool to identify and classify malware

=== Decentralized and Anonymous Communication Projects ===
- Bitmessage – encrypted peer-to-peer messaging protocol
- Briar – encrypted and resilient peer-to-peer communication technology
- Freenet – peer-to-peer platform for censorship-resistant communication
- I2P – anonymous network layer for secure communication
- Nym Technologies – privacy- and security-focused VPN service
- Tor (network) – free overlay network for enabling anonymous communication

=== Decentralized File Sharing and Storage ===
- qBittorrent – BitTorrent client
- Transmission (BitTorrent client) – lightweight BitTorrent client
- IPFS – InterPlanetary File System for decentralized storage and sharing
- RetroShare – secure communication platform with file sharing

=== Cryptocurrencies and Anonymous Finance ===
- Zerocoin – privacy-focused cryptocurrency protocol
- Zcash – cryptocurrency based on Zerocoin using zk-SNARKs
- Monero – privacy-focused cryptocurrency using ring signatures
- NYM — Nym mixnet privacy- and security-focused token
- Tornado Cash — Cryptocurrency tumbler

== Cybersecurity ==
=== Antivirus ===
- ClamAV – cross-platform antimalware toolkit written in C and C++, able to detect many types of malware including viruses
- ClamWin – antivirus tool for Windows and written in C, C++
- Lynis – security audit tool (set of shell scripts) for Unix and Linux

=== Data loss prevention ===
- MyDLP not updated since 2014

=== Data recovery ===
- dvdisaster
- ddrescue
- Foremost
- PhotoRec
- TestDisk

==== Forensics ====
- The Coroner's Toolkit
- The Sleuth Kit

===== Anti-forensics =====
- USBKill
- Tails
- BusKill

=== Disk erasing ===
- DBAN
- srm

=== Encryption ===
- Bouncy Castle
- GnuPG
- GnuTLS
- KGPG
- NaCl
- OpenSSL
- Seahorse
- Signal
- stunnel
- TextSecure
- wolfCrypt
- 7-Zip

==== Disk encryption ====
- dm-crypt
- FreeOTFE and FreeOTFE Explorer
- eCryptfs
- VeraCrypt

=== Firewall ===
- Firewalld
- Uncomplicated Firewall (ufw)
- Firestarter
- IPFilter
- ipfw
- iptables
- nftables
- IPFire
- LEAF Project
- M0n0wall
- PeerGuardian
- PF
- pfSense
- OPNsense
- Rope
- Shorewall
- SmoothWall
- Vyatta
- VyOS

=== Network and security monitoring ===
- Snort – network intrusion detection system (IDS) and intrusion prevention system (IPS)
- Suricata – network threat detection engine
- OpenVAS – software framework of several services and tools offering vulnerability scanning and vulnerability management
- Nmap – network scanner, port scanner, and security auditing tool
- Nikto – web server vulnerability scanner
- Volatility – memory forensics framework for incident response

=== Secure Shell (SSH) ===
- Cyberduck – macOS and Windows client (since version 4.0)
- Lsh – server and client, with support for SRP and Kerberos authentication
- OpenSSH – client and server
- PuTTY – client-only

=== Password management ===
- Bitwarden
- KeePass
- KeePassXC – multiplatform fork able to open KeePass databases
- Password Safe
- Mitro
- Pass
- Proton Pass

== Data storage and management ==
=== Disk cleaning utilities ===
- BleachBit

=== Database management systems (including administration) ===
- Apache Cassandra – NoSQL database from Apache Software Foundation offers support for clusters spanning multiple datacenter
- Apache CouchDB – NoSQL database from Apache Software Foundation with multi-master replication
- MariaDB – community-developed relational database management system with pluggable storage engines and commercial support
- PostGIS – adds support for geographic objects to the PostgreSQL as per Open Geospatial Consortium (OGC)
- PostgreSQL – relational database management system emphasizes on extensibility and SQL compliance and available for Windows, Linux, FreeBSD, and OpenBSD

=== Data mining ===
- Carrot2
- ELKI
- FrontlineSMS
- General Architecture for Text Engineering (GATE)
- KNIME
- mlpack
- MOA
- NLTK
- OpenNN
- Orange
- R
- RapidMiner
- scikit-learn
- Scriptella
- UIMA
- Weka

=== Data Visualization Components ===
- ParaView – plotting and visualization functions developed by Sandia National Laboratory; capable of massively parallel flow visualization utilizing multiple computer processors
- VTK – toolkit for 3D computer graphics, image processing, and visualisation

=== Data interchange and markup libraries ===
- libxml2 – C library for parsing XML documents

=== Disk partitioning software ===
- GParted
- FIPS (computer program)
- TestDisk

=== Enterprise search engines ===
- ApexKB (formerly known as Jumper)
- Lucene
- Nutch
- Solr
- Xapian

=== ETLs (Extract Transform Load) ===
- Konstanz Information Miner (KNIME)
- Pentaho

=== File archivers ===
- PeaZip
- 7-Zip

=== File systems ===
- OpenAFS – distributed file system supporting a very wide variety of operating systems
- Tahoe-LAFS – distributed file system/Cloud storage system with integrated privacy and security features
- CephFS – distributed file system included in the Ceph storage platform

== Desktop publishing ==
- Collabora Online Draw and Writer – edition of LibreOffice accessible from a web browser
- Scribus – designed for layout, typesetting, and preparation of files for professional-quality image-setting equipment. It can also create animated and interactive PDF presentations and forms
- LyX – "What You See Is What You Mean" document creation system, LyX makes use of the LaTeX markup macro system for TeX, allowing the elegant creation of documents which match up with the layouts in it for various document classes

== E-book management and editing ==
- Calibre – cross-platform suite of ebook software
- Collabora Online Writer – edition of LibreOffice accessible from a web browser
- Sigil – editing software for e-books in the EPUB format

== Education ==
=== E-learning, learning support ===
- ATutor – web-based Learning Content Management System (LCMS)
- Canvas LMS – web-based, open, extensible learning management system
- Chamilo – web-based e-learning and content management system
- Claroline – collaborative Learning Management System
- DoceboLMS – SAAS/cloud platform for learning
- eFront – icon-based learning management system
- H5P – framework for creating and sharing interactive HTML5 content
- IUP Portfolio – educational platform for Swedish schools
- ILIAS – web-based learning management system (LMS)
- Moodle – learning management system
- OLAT – web-based Learning Content Management System
- Omeka – content management system for online digital collections
- Sakai Project – web-based learning management system
- SWAD – web-based learning management system

=== Academic advising ===
- FlightPath – academic advising software for universities

=== Educational suites for children ===
- Tux Paint – painting application for 3–12 year olds
- GCompris – educational entertainment, aimed at children aged 2–10

=== Language ===
- Alpheios Project
- Anki (software)
- FirstVoices
- Kiten

=== Operating systems ===
- Linux – Unix-like general use OS
- FreeBSD
- Fuchsia
- RedoxOS
- OpenBSD
- DragonFlyBSD
- NetBSD
- GNU/Hurd

=== Mind mapping & others ===
- Vym (software)
- Compendium (software)
- Gnaural – brainwave entrainment software

=== Offline learning & Open data ===
- Kiwix – offline web browser that allows users to download Wikipedia's entire content and use it for offline learning. Later it was expanded with repositories for Wikimedia Foundation, public domain texts from Project Gutenberg, many of the Stack Exchange sites, and other resources
- OpenStreetMap – OpenStreetMap was developed in 2004. It uses Open data and users data input through Crowdsourcing and Web mapping to create a complete and downloadable alternative to other online maps. This allow users to enter data when there is no data available due to lack of governance and economic interest or due to lower population of the places mapped

=== Typing ===
- KTouch – touch typing lessons with a variety of keyboard layouts
- Tux Typing – typing tutor for children, featuring two games to improve typing speed

== Engineering ==
- Advanced Simulation Library
- ASCEND
- Calcpad
- Calculix
- CHEMKIN – chemical kinetics
- COCO simulator – chemical process simulator
- CP2K – quantum chemistry and solid-state physics
- DWSIM – chemical process simulator
- General Mission Analysis Tool (GMAT) – space mission analysis
- GNU Octave – numerical-analysis
- GROMACS – simulations of proteins, lipids, and nucleic acids
- JSBSim – flight dynamics engine
- LAMMPS – Molecular dynamics
- Open Babel – chemical informatics
- OpenModelica – chemical process simulator
- OpenSees – earthquake engineering
- OpenVSP – parametric aircraft geometry tool
- Pyomo – mathematical optimization
- QBlade – wind turbine design and aerodynamic simulation software
- REFPROP – reference Fluid Thermodynamic and Transport Properties
- XFOIL – analysis of subsonic isolated airfoils

=== Open-source EDA software ===
- Electric
- FreePCB
- Fritzing
- gEDA
- GNU Circuit Analysis Package
- Icarus Verilog
- KiCad
- KTechLab
- Magic
- Ngspice
- OpenROAD
- Oregano
- pcb-rnd
- Qucs
- Verilator
- XCircuit

== File formats ==
=== 2D ===
==== Raster imagery ====
- .apng – Animated Portable Network Graphics
- .avif – AV1 Image File Format
- .bpg – Better Portable Graphics
- .exr – OpenEXR
- .fits – Flexible Image Transport System primarily for Astronomy
- .flif – Free Lossless Image Format
- .gif – Graphics Interchange Format
- .iff / .lbm – InterLeaved BitMap
- .jng – JPEG Network Graphics
- .jpg or .jpeg – Joint Photographic Experts Group
- .jxl – JPEG XL
- .mng – Multiple-image Network Graphics
- .miff / .mi – Magick Image File Format
- .pam, .pbm, .pgm, .ppm, .pnm – Netpbm file formats
- .pgf – Progressive Graphics File
- .png – Portable Network Graphics
- .qoi – Quite OK Image Format
- .tiff – Tag Image File Format
- .wbmp – Wireless Application Protocol Bitmap Format
- .webp
- .xbm – X BitMap
- .xcf – GIMP
- .xpm – X PixMap

==== Vector imagery ====
- .cgm – Computer Graphics Metafile
- .eps – Encapsulated PostScript
- .pdf – Portable Document Format
- .pgml – Precision Graphics Markup Language
- .svg – Scalable Vector Graphics
- .vml – Vector Markup Language, deprecated by SVG
- .xar – Xar (graphics)

=== 3D ===
- .3mf – 3D Manufacturing Format
- .amf – Additive manufacturing file format
- .blend – Blender
- .dae – COLLADA
- .dxf – Drawing Exchange Format, publicly documented format, developers can work with it in open-source projects, though not fully open-source itself.
- .fbx
- .gltf/.glb – Graphics Library Transmission Format
- .hdr – Radiance HDR
- .ifc – Industry Foundation Classes
- .iges – Initial Graphics Exchange Specification
- .obj – developed by Wavefront Technologies
- .off – Object File Format
- .ply – Polygon File Format
- .rad – Radiance
- .step/.stp
- .stl
- .usd – Universal Scene Description
- .vrml – Virtual Reality Modeling Language
- .x3d

=== Video ===
==== Containers ====
- .mkv – Matroska
- .ogv – Ogg video
- .webm – WebM

==== Codecs ====
===== Audio codecs =====
- Apple Lossless
- CELT
- Codec2
- FAAD2
- FFmpeg
- FLAC
- Fraunhofer FDK AAC
- iLBC
- iSAC
- LAME
- libdca
- libopus
- libvorbis
- Musepack
- Speex
- TooLAME / TwoLAME
- WavPack

===== Video codecs =====
- Daala
- dav1d
- Dirac
- FFmpeg
- Huffyuv
- Lagarith
- libaom
- libgav1
- libtheora
- libvpx
- OpenH264
- rav1e
- SVT-AV1
- Thor
- x264
- x265
- Xvid

=== Document & Text ===
- .adoc – AsciiDoc
- .epub – ebook format
- .latex – LaTeX, macro package built on top of TeX for simplification
- .md – Markdown
- .odt – OpenDocument
- .rtf – Rich Text Format
- .tex – high-quality typography for mathematical notation, physics, chemistry, engineering/scientific notation
- .texinfo

=== Web and Interactive Media ===
- .css – Cascading Style Sheets
- .html – HyperText Markup Language
- .json – GeoJSON, JSON-LD, JSON-RPC, JsonML, Smile, UBJSON
- .mml – MathML

=== Database & Data Storage ===
- .avro – Apache Avro
- .cml – Chemical Markup Language
- .csv – Comma-separated values
- .hdf5 – Hierarchical Data Format
- .ods – OpenDocument Spreadsheet
- .orc – Apache ORC
- .parquet – Apache Parquet
- .protobuf – Protocol Buffers developed by Google
- .shp – Shapefile
- .sqlite – SQLite
- .tsv – Tab-separated values
- .xml – Extensible Markup Language

== Finance ==
=== Accounting ===
- 1DayLater – invoicing software
- GnuCash – double-entry book-keeping
- HomeBank – personal accounting software
- KMyMoney – double-entry book-keeping
- LedgerSMB – double-entry book-keeping
- RCA open-source application – management accounting application
- SQL-Ledger – double-entry book-keeping
- TurboCASH – double-entry book-keeping for Windows

=== Cryptocurrency ===
- Bitcoin – blockchain platform, peer-to-peer decentralised digital currency
- Ethereum – blockchain platform with smart contract functionality

=== CRM ===
- CiviCRM – Constituent Relationship Management software aimed at charities and NGOs
- iDempiere – business Suite, ERP and CRM
- SuiteCRM – web-based CRM

=== ERP ===
- Adempiere – Enterprise resource planning (ERP) business suite
- Apache OFBiz – suite of enterprise applications from Apache Software Foundation
- Compiere – ERP solution automates accounting, supply chain, inventory, and sales orders
- Dolibarr – web-based ERP system
- ERPNext – web-based ERP system for managing accounting and finance
- ERP5 – Single Unified Business Model based system written with Python and Zope
- iDempiere – fully navigable on PCs, tablets and smartphones driven only by a community of supporters
- JFire – ERP business suite written with Java and JDO
- LedgerSMB – double entry accounting and ERP system written with Perl
- metasfresh – ERP Software
- Odoo – ERP, CRM and CMS
- Openbravo – web-based ERP
- Tryton – ERP

=== Human resources ===
- OrangeHRM – commercial human resource management

=== Microfinance ===
- Mifos – microfinance Institution management software

== Games ==
=== Game engines ===
- A-Frame (VR)
- Adventure Game Studio
- Aleph One
- Ardor3D
- Babylon.js
- Blend4Web
- Blender Game Engine
- ClanLib
- Cocos2d
- Crystal Space
- Cube Engine
- Cube 2 engine
- Dagor Engine
- Defold
- Delta3D
- Dim3
- DimensioneX Multiplayer Engine
- Doom engine
- Flixel
- Game Editor
- GDevelop
- Godot
- Horde3D
- id Tech 3
- id Tech 4
- Irrlicht
- Jake2
- Java 3D
- jMonkeyEngine
- Kivy
- LayaAir
- LibGDX
- LÖVE
- Moai
- Monkey X
- MonoGame
- Open 3D Engine
- OGRE
- OHRRPGCE
- OpenClonk
- OpenMW
- OpenSimulator
- ORX
- Panda3D
- Phaser
- PlayCanvas
- PlayN
- Pygame
- Quake engine
- Quake II engine
- Ren'Py
- Solar2D
- Starling Framework
- StepMania
- Stratagus
- Stride
- Three.js
- TIC-80
- Torque3D
- Turbulenz engine
- Twine
- Visual Pinball
- Wintermute Engine

=== Physics engines ===
- Box2D
- Bullet
- Cannon.js
- Chipmunk
- Newton Game Dynamics
- Open Dynamics Engine
- NVIDIA PhysX
- Phyz
- Project Chrono

=== Shader languages ===
- ARB assembly language
- Cg
- OpenGL Shading Language
- Open Shading Language
- Standard Portable Intermediate Representation

=== Action ===
- Nexuiz – first-person shooter
- OpenArena – first-person shooter
- Red Eclipse – first-person shooter
- Tremulous – first-person shooter
- Unvanquished – First-person shooter
- Xonotic – first-person shooter that runs on a heavily modified version of the Quake engine known as the DarkPlaces engine
- Warsow – first-person shooter fast-paced arena FPS game that runs on the Qfusion engine

=== Application layer ===
- WINE – allows Windows applications to be run on Unix-like operating systems

=== Chess ===
- ChessV
- Fairy-Max
- GNU Chess
- PyChess
- XBoard
- Lichess

=== Educational games ===
- GCompris – software suite comprising educational entertainment software for children aged 2 to 10
- Tux, of Math Command
- Tux Paint

=== Video game emulation ===
- MAME – multi-platform emulator for arcade game systems
- Mednafen – multi-platform emulator
- MESS – multi-platform emulator
- RetroArch – cross-platform front-end for emulators, game engines and video games
- Snes9x – Super Nintendo emulator
- Stella – Atari 2600 emulator
- PCSX – PlayStation emulator
- PCSX2 – PlayStation 2 emulator
- PPSSPP – PlayStation Portable emulator
- Project64 – Nintendo 64 emulator
- RPCS3 – PlayStation 3 emulator
- Dolphin (emulator) – GameCube and Wii emulator
- Citra (emulator) – Nintendo 3DS and Wii emulator
- Cemu – Wii U emulator
- TIC-80 – virtual machine game engine that mimics the 8-bit systems of the 1980s

=== Music video games ===
- Frets on Fire

==== Karaoke ====
- UltraStar

==== Rhythm game ====
- StepMania

=== Puzzle ===
- Pingus – Lemmings alternative with penguins instead of lemmings

=== Sandbox ===
- Luanti – voxel game engine

=== Snake games ===
- GLtron

=== Simulation ===
- Endless Sky – space trading and combat simulation
- FlightGear – flight simulator
- OpenTTD – business simulation game in which players try to earn money via transporting passengers and freight by road, rail, water and air
- SuperTuxKart – kart racing game that features mascots of various open-source projects

=== Strategy ===
- 0 A.D. – real-time strategy video game
- Freeciv – turn-based strategy game inspired by proprietary Sid Meier's Civilization series
- Glest
- The Battle for Wesnoth – turn-based strategy video game with fantasy setting

== Genealogy ==
- Gramps (software) – genealogy software

== Geographic information systems ==
- QGIS – cross-platform desktop geographic information system (GIS) application to view, edit, and analyse geospatial data

== Integrated library management software ==
- CollectionSpace – collections management system for museums
- Evergreen – integrated Library System initially developed for the Georgia Public Library Service's PINES catalog
- FOLIO – Modular, open-source library services platform
- Koha – SQL-based library management
- NewGenLib
- OpenBiblio
- PMB
- refbase – web-based institutional repository and reference management software

== Image editor ==
- Darktable – digital image workflow management, including RAW photo processing
- digiKam – integrated photography toolkit including editing abilities
- GIMP – raster graphics editor aimed at image retouching/editing
- Hugin – panorama stitching
- Inkscape – vector graphics editor
- Karbon – scalable vector drawing application in KDE
- Krita – digital painting, sketching and 2D animation application, with a variety of brush engines
- LazPaint – raster and vector graphics editor, aimed at being simpler to use than GIMP
- LightZone – digital photo editor software application
- Luminance HDR – high dynamic range images
- RawTherapee – digital image workflow management aimed at RAW photo processing

== Maps & navigation ==
- OpenStreetMap – open geographic database updated and maintained by a community of volunteers via open collaboration
- OsmAnd – freemium maps & navigation Android and iOS app
- Organic Maps – offline map and navigation app for Android & iOS
- CoMaps (Android, iOS)

== Mathematics ==
=== Calculators ===
- Calcpad
- GeoGebra
- GNOME Calculator
- KCalc
- Qalculate!
- WRPN Calculator
- xcalc

=== Computer algebra systems ===
- ALTRAN
- Axiom
- Cadabra
- Cambridge Algebra System
- CoCoA
- CPMP-Tools
- Erable
- Fermat
- FORM
- FriCAS
- GAP
- GiNaC
- Macaulay2
- Mathomatic
- Maxima
- Normaliz
- OpenAxiom
- PARI/GP
- Reduce
- SageMath
- Singular
- SymbolicC++
- SymPy
- Xcas
- Yacas

=== Physics ===
==== Computational electromagnetics ====
- Meep
- Elmer FEM solver
- Numerical Electromagnetics Code

==== Computational fluid dynamics ====
- ADCIRC
- Calculix
- CGNS
- Code Saturne
- Coolfluid
- Elmer FEM solver
- FEATool Multiphysics
- FEniCS Project
- Gerris
- KIVA
- MFEM
- MOOSE
- Nek5000
- Nektar++
- OpenFOAM
- OpenLB
- RELAP5-3D
- QBlade
- SU2 code
- TELEMAC

==== Computational particle physics ====
- AIDA
- APFEL
- CASINO
- CompHEP
- CORSIKA
- CP2K
- EGS
- EPICS
- FitIt
- Geant4
- MPMC
- OpenMC
- PYTHIA
- ROOT
- Solarsoft
- Spinach
- Surface Evolver
- TARDIS
- UrQMD

==== Computational astrophysics ====
- Astropy
- CMBFAST
- GADGET

==== Monte Carlo method ====
- CP2K
- EGS
- MCSim
- McStas
- McXtrace
- MPMC
- OpenMC
- TARDIS

=== Symbolic manipulation systems ===
- FORM (symbolic manipulation system)

=== Statistics ===
- ADaMSoft
- ADMB
- Chronux
- DAP
- Epi Info
- Fityk
- gretl
- jamovi
- JASP
- JAGS
- OpenBUGS
- OpenEpi
- OpenMx
- PSPP
- R
- Salstat
- SOCR
- SOFA Statistics
- Stan (software)

=== Numerical analysis ===
- ADMB
- Euler Math Toolbox
- FreeMat
- GNU Data Language
- GNU MCSim
- GNU Octave
- J
- Julia
- Owl Scientific Computing
- Perl Data Language
- S-Lang
- Scilab
- Yorick

=== Mathematical libraries ===
==== C ====
- AMD Core Math Library
- Fastest Fourier Transform in the West
- GNU MPFR
- GNU Multi-Precision Library
- GNU Scientific Library
- hypre
- Integer set library
- Libfixmath
- Lis (linear algebra library)
- OpenBLAS
- PETSc
- UMFPACK

==== C++ ====
- Adept
- Advanced Simulation Library
- Armadillo
- Blitz++
- Boost.uBLAS
- CGAL
- Class Library for Numbers
- deal.II
- Eigen
- GetFEM++
- IML++
- IT++
- LAPACK++
- Matrix Template Library
- MFEM
- Multiple Precision Integers and Rationals
- Number Theory Library
- SU2 code
- Template Numerical Toolkit
- Trilinos

==== Fortran ====
- ARPACK
- Automatically Tuned Linear Algebra Software
- BLAS
- BLIS
- EISPACK
- LAPACK
- Librsb
- LINPACK
- Lis
- MINPACK
- PETSc
- QUADPACK
- SLATEC
- SOFA

==== Java ====
- Colt
- Efficient Java Matrix Library
- ojAlgo
- JAMA
- Parallel Colt
- Matrix Toolkit Java

==== .NET ====
- Accord.NET
- ALGLIB
- Math.NET Numerics
- Meta.Numerics

=== Perl ===
- Perl Data Language

==== Python ====
- CuPy
- Dask
- Manim
- Matplotlib
- NetworkX
- NumPy
- PyMC
- SciPy
- SymPy

=== Geometry ===
- Geogebra – geometry and algebra
- C.a.R.
- CaRMetal
- DrGeo
- Kig
- KSEG

=== Plotting software ===
- Chart.js
- D3.js
- ggplot2
- Graphics Layout Engine
- Gnuplot
- Grace
- Matplotlib
- Plotly
- PLplot
- PyX
- ROOT
- SciDAVis
- Vega

=== Charting ===
- JFreeChart
- Matplotlib
- R

=== Mathematical biology ===
- COPASI
- Systems Biology Simulation Core Library
- Virtual Cell

=== Mathematical chemistry ===
- Cantera
- CP2K
- MOPAC
- NWChem
- Psi4

=== Mathematical notation software ===
- AUCTeX
- Apache OpenOffice Math
- AsciiMath
- Calligra Words – Formula editor
- GeoGebra
- GNOME LaTeX
- GNU TeXmacs
- Gummi
- KaTeX
- Kile
- LaTeX
- LibreOffice Math
- LyX
- MathJax
- MathML
- Notepad++
- Overleaf
- TeX
- TeX Live
- Texmaker
- TeXnicCenter
- TeXShop
- TeXstudio
- TeXworks
- Vim

=== Mathematical art software ===
- Apophysis
- Electric Sheep
- Fyre
- MilkDrop
- openPlaG
- XaoS
- R, R Mandelbrot sets
- Picogen
- GeoGebra
- Processing
- P5.js
- matplotlib
- gnuplot
- Inkscape spirograph
- LaTeX, PGF/TikZ
- Manim
- D3.js
- openFrameworks

=== Spreadsheet ===
- Collabora Online Calc – spreadsheet component of the Collabora Online package
- LibreOffice Calc – spreadsheet component of the LibreOffice package
- OnlyOffice Spreadsheets – spreadsheet software of OnlyOffice suite
- Gnumeric – spreadsheet program of the GNOME Project
- Calligra Sheets – spreadsheet component of the Calligra Suite in KDE
- Proton Sheets – spreadsheet component of office suite and Drive
- Pyspread – spreadsheet which uses Python for macro programming, and allows each cell to contain data, the results of a calculation, a Python program, or the results of a Python program

== Mobile software ==
- Celestia (Android, iOS)
- Calligra (Android)
- Collabora Office (Android, ChromeOS, iOS, iPadOS)
- CoMaps (Android, iOS)
- Conversations (Android)
- F-Droid (Android) – app store and software repository
- I2P (Android) – anonymous network layer (implemented as a mix network) that allows for censorship-resistant, peer-to-peer communication
- Kiwix – offline web browser that allows users to download the entire content of Wikipedia for offline learning purposes. (Android)
- Krita (Android)
- Linphone (Android, iOS)
- Monal (iOS)
- NetHunter App Store (Android) – fork of F-Droid for Kali NetHunter
- OsmAnd – freemium maps & navigation Android and iOS app
- OpenVPN (Android, iOS) – virtual private network (VPN) system that implements techniques to create secure point-to-point or site-to-site connections in routed or bridged configurations and remote access facilities. It implements both client and server applications
- Orbot (Android, iOS) – free proxy app that provides anonymity on the Internet for users of the Android and iOS operating systems. It allows traffic from apps such as web browsers, email clients, map programs, and others to be routed via the Tor network
- Organic Maps – offline map and navigation app for Android & iOS
- Quicksy (Android)
- Tor Browser – onion-routed browser by The Tor Project, based on Firefox ESR
- VLC (Android, iOS)
- Wikipedia (Android, iOS) – See also: List of Wikipedia mobile applications

== Media ==
=== Audio editors, audio management ===
- Audacity
- Ardour – professional digital audio workstation
- LMMS – digital audio workstation

=== CD/USB-writing software ===
- Brasero (software)
- cdrtools
- K3b
- X-CD-Roast

=== Flash animation ===
- Pencil2D – for animations
- SWFTools – for scripting

=== Game engines ===
- Blender Game Engine – discontinued 2019
- Godot – application for the design of cross-platform video games
- MonoGame – C# framework
- Open3DEngine – based on Amazon Lumberyard
- Stride – (prev. Xenko) 2D and 3D cross-platform game engine originally developed by Silicon Studio

==== Chess engines ====
- KnightCap
- Leela Chess Zero – Universal Chess Interface chess engine
- Stockfish – Universal Chess Interface chess engine

=== Graphics ===
==== 2D ====
- Pencil2D – simple 2D graphics and animation program
- Synfig – 2D vector graphics and timeline based animation
- TupiTube (formerly KTooN) – application for the design and creation of animation
- OpenToonz – part of a family of 2D animation software
- Krita – digital painting, sketching and 2D animation application, with a variety of brush engines
- Blender – computer graphics software, Blender's Grease Pencil tools allow for 2D animation within a full 3D pipeline
- mtPaint – raster graphics editor for creating icons, pixel art

==== 3D ====
- Blender – computer graphics software featuring modeling, sculpting, texturing, rigging, simulation, rendering, camera tracking, video editing, and compositing
- FreeCAD
- MakeHuman
- OpenFX – modeling and animation software with a variety of built-in post processing effects
- Picogen – terrain generator
- Seamless3d – node-driven 3D modeling software
- Wings 3D – subdivision modeler inspired by Nendo and Mirai from Izware

==== 3D rendering ====
- Aqsis
- Cycles and EEVEE – Blender rendering
- LuxCoreRender
- MoonRay
- POV-Ray
- Radiance (software)
- Sunflow

=== Image galleries ===
- Shotwell
- Wikimedia Commons

=== Image viewers ===
- Eye of GNOME
- F-spot
- feh
- Geeqie
- Gthumb
- Gwenview
- KPhotoAlbum
- Opticks

=== Maps ===
- GeoDa
- GeoServer
- GeoTools
- GRASS GIS
- GvSIG
- ILWIS
- JUMP GIS
- Kosmo (GIS)
- Libre Map Project
- MapWindow GIS
- Mapnik
- MapServer
- Marble
- OpenStreetMap
- OpenLayers
- PostGIS
- QGIS
- RustGIS
- SAGA GIS
- uDig
- Whitebox Geospatial Analysis Tools

=== Music ===
==== Digital audio workstations ====
- Ardour
- Audacity
- LMMS
- MusE
- Qtractor
- Rosegarden

==== Scorewriters ====
- Denemo
- Frescobaldi
- Impro-Visor
- LilyPond
- MuseScore Studio
- MusiXTeX
- NoteEdit
- Philip's Music Writer
- Rosegarden

=== Subtitle ===
- Aegisub
- Gnome Subtitles
- Subtitle Edit

=== Video converters ===
- Dr. DivX
- FFmpeg
- MEncoder
- OggConvert

=== DVD authoring ===
- DeVeDe
- DVD Flick
- DVDStyler

=== Video editing ===
- Avidemux
- AviSynth
- Blender (VSE)
- Cinelerra
- Flowblade
- Kdenlive
- Kino
- LiVES
- LosslessCut
- Natron
- OpenShot
- Open Movie Editor
- Pitivi
- Shotcut
- VirtualDub
- VideoLAN Movie Creator

=== Screencast ===
- recordMyDesktop
- Open Broadcaster Software (OBS Studio) – cross-platform streaming and recording program

=== Other media packages ===
- Celtx – media pre-production software

=== Ripping ===
- K9Copy
- Thoggen

=== Video players ===
- Media Player Classic
- VLC media player
- mpv

== Networking and Internet ==
=== Advertising ===
- Revive Adserver

=== Communication-related ===
- Asterisk – telephony and VoIP server
- Ekiga – video conferencing application for GNOME and Microsoft Windows
- ConferenceXP – video conferencing application for Windows XP or later
- Dino – xmpp client, supporting both OMEMO encryption and Jingle Audio/Video protocol, under Windows, Linux and BSD
- FreePBX – front-end and advanced PBX configuration for Asterisk
- FreeSWITCH – telephony platform
- Gajim – xmpp client
- Jami – cross-platform, peer to peer instant-messaging and video-calling protocol that offers end-to-end encryption and SIP client
- Jitsi – Java VoIP and Instant Messaging client
- QuteCom – voice, video, and IM client application
- Enterprise Communications System sipXecs – SIP Communications Server
- Telegram
- Twinkle – VoIP softphone
- Tox – cross-platform, peer-to-peer instant-messaging and video-calling protocol that offers end-to-end encryption

=== E-mail ===
- Amavis – email content filter
- Claws Mail – email Client
- Fetchmail – email Retrieval
- Geary – email client based on WebKitGTK+
- GNUMail – cross-platform email client
- Hula – discontinued mail and calendar project
- K-9 Mail – Android Email Client
- MailScanner – email security system
- MH Message Handling System – email Client
- Modest – email Client
- Mozilla Mail & Newsgroups – email Client that was part of the now discontinued Mozilla Application Suite
- Mozilla Thunderbird – email, news, RSS, and chat client
- POPFile – cross-platform mail filter
- Proton Mail – app and web-based end-to-end encrypted e-mail evolved to become FOSS
- Roundcube – web-based IMAP email client
- Sylpheed – email and News Client
- Sympa – MLA software

=== File transfer ===
- Filezilla
- OnionShare

=== Grid and distributed processing ===
- GNU Queue
- HTCondor
- pexec

=== Cloud computing platforms ===
- Apache CloudStack
- Cloud Foundry
- Eucalyptus
- OpenNebula
- OpenStack

=== Middleware ===
- Apache Axis2 – Web service framework (implementations are available in both Java & C)
- Apache Geronimo – application server
- GlassFish – application server
- Apache Tomcat – servlet container and standalone webserver
- JBoss – application server
- OpenRemote – IoT Middleware
- TAO (software) – C++ implementation of the OMG's CORBA standard

=== RSS, Atom readers, aggregators ===
- Akregator – platforms running KDE
- Liferea – platforms running GNOME
- NetNewsWire – macOS, iOS
- RSS Bandit – Windows, using .NET framework
- RSSOwl – Windows, macOS, Solaris, Linux using Java SWT Eclipse

=== Social network ===
- Bluesky – microblogging platform similar to Twitter utilizing the AT Protocol
- Mastodon – platform for decentralized social networking with microblogging features
- Nostr – open protocol for decentralized message transmission, with the intention to be able to resist internet censorship while maintaining session integrity.

=== Peer-to-peer file sharing ===
- I2P – anonymous network layer (implemented as a mix network) that allows for censorship-resistant, peer-to-peer communication
- OnionShare – file sharing app using Tor network
- Popcorn Time – multi-platform media player
- qBittorrent – BitTorrent client
- Transmission – BitTorrent client
- Deluge – BitTorrent client

=== Portal Server ===
- Drupal
- Liferay
- Sun Java System Portal Server
- uPortal

=== Remote access and management ===
- FreeNX
- OpenVPN
- rdesktop
- Synergy
- VNC (RealVNC, TightVNC, UltraVNC)
- Remmina (based on FreeRDP)

=== Monitoring and observability ===
- Cacti
- Grafana
- Icinga
- Munin
- Nagios
- OpenNMS
- Prometheus
- RRDtool
- Zabbix

=== Web browsers ===
==== Graphical ====
- Chromium – web browser using the custom Blink engine from which Google Chrome draws its source code
- Brave – privacy-focused web browser based on Chromium browser
- Falkon – web browser based on Blink engine, a KDE project
- Firefox – Mozilla-developed web browser using Gecko layout engine
- Mullvad Browser – privacy-focused browser codeveloped with primary developer Tor Project and distributed by Mullvad
- Waterfox – Firefox fork supporting legacy extensions, 64-bit only
- Pale Moon – customizable fork of Firefox
- Tor Browser – onion-routed browser by The Tor Project, based on Firefox ESR
- GNOME Web – WebKit-based web browser for the GNOME desktop environment
- Midori – web browser using the WebKit layout engine
- qutebrowser – keyboard operated Webkit-based browser with vi-like keybindings
- SeaMonkey Navigator – the SeaMonkey internet suite's web browser
- Surf – minimal tab-less browser by suckless.org using WebKitGTK
- Firefox Focus – privacy-focused mobile web browser from Mozilla available for Android and iOS

==== Text-based ====
- Lynx – text-based web browser developed since 1992
- Links – text-based browser with a framebuffer-based graphical mode
- ELinks – fork of Links with JavaScript support

=== Webcam ===
- Cheese – GNOME webcam application
- Guvcview – Linux webcam application

=== Webgrabber ===
- cURL
- HTTrack
- Wget

=== Web-related ===
- Apache Cocoon – web application framework
- Apache Tomcat
- Apache – web server
- AWStats – log file parser and analyzer
- BookmarkSync – tool for browsers
- Caddy – extensible, cross-platform, web server written in Go.
- Cherokee – HTTP server
- curl-loader – HTTP/HTTPS/FTP/FTPS loading and testing tool
- Docker – Docker Engine is open-source for Linux only
- FileZilla – FTP
- H2O – supports HTTP/2, TLS, and server push
- Hiawatha – HTTP server
- lighttpd – HTTP Server
- Lucee – CFML application server
- Nginx – web server/reverse proxy and e-mail (IMAP/POP3) proxy
- NetKernel – Internet application server
- Qcodo – PHP5 framework
- Squid – web proxy cache
- thttpd – designed for simplicity, small memory footprint, and speed
- Vaadin – Java-based framework for creating web applications
- Varnish – web application accelerator/reverse proxy and load balancer/HTTP router
- XAMPP – package of web applications including Apache and MariaDB
- Zope – web application server

=== Web search engines ===
- SearXNG – self-hostable metasearch engine
- YaCy – P2P-based search engine

=== Other networking programs ===
- JXplorer – LDAP client
- Nextcloud – fork of ownCloud
- OpenLDAP – LDAP server
- ownCloud – file share and sync server
- Wireshark – network monitor

== Office software ==
=== Text editors ===
Software	Platform
AbiWord	Linux, Windows
Atom (text editor)	macOS 10.9 or later, Windows 7 and later, and Linux
gedit	Linux, MacOS
GNOME Text Editor	Linux
Kate (text editor)	25 Linux distributions, Microsoft Windows, macOS
Leafpad	Linux, BSD, Maemo
Metapad	Windows
Mousepad	Linux, BSD, Maemo
Notepad++	Windows
Proton Doc	Linux, macOS, Windows, Android, iOS
Visual Studio Code	Linux, Windows, macOS

=== Spreadsheet software ===
Software	Operating system	Format
Gnumeric	Unix-like (Linux included)	.gnm, .gnumeric
GNU Oleo	Linux	.oleo
Pyspread	Unix-like, Windows	.CSV, .XLS, .SVG, .PDF
Sheetster	Cross-platform	JSON, XML, .XLS, .CSV, xlsx/.ooxml, .exml, .zip

=== Office suites ===
- Apache OpenOffice – the cross platform office productivity suite from Apache Software Foundation (ASF) consists of programs for word processing, spreadsheets, presentation, diagrams and drawings, databases, etc.
- Calligra Suite – the office productivity suite from KDE consists of programs for word processing, spreadsheets, presentation, databases, vector graphics, and digital painting
- Collabora Online – edition of LibreOffice, web application, mobile phone, tablet, Chromebook and desktop (Windows, macOS, Linux)
- LibreOffice – the cross platform office productivity suite from The Document Foundation (TDF) consists of programs for word processing, spreadsheets, presentation, diagrams and drawings, databases, etc.
- OnlyOffice Desktop Editors – offline edition of the Cloud

== PDF editors ==
- PDFsam Basic edition – platform independent software designed to split, merge, mix, extract pages and rotate PDF files for Windows, Linux, MacOS. Open-source version of their commercial offering

== Operating systems ==
Be advised that available distributions of these systems can contain, or offer to build and install, added software that is neither free software nor open-source.

- BSD – FreeBSD, OpenBSD, NetBSD, GhostBSD, TrueNAS, MidnightBSD, DragonFly BSD, OPNsense, pfSense, XigmaNAS, among others.
- GrapheneOS – Privacy- and security-focused, Android-based mobile operating system
- Kali NetHunter
- Linux – Debian, Ubuntu, Manjaro, Fedora, openSUSE, antiX, NixOS, Kali, Alpine, Tails, Mageia, Slackware, Gentoo, BlackArch, among others (List of Linux distributions).
- LineageOS – Android-based operative system for tablets and mobile phones
- GNU Hurd
- Mobian
- Nura
- Plasma Mobile
- PureOS
- Ubuntu Touch
- Redox OS
- FreeDOS – OS compatible with IBM PC DOS and Microsoft's MS-DOS
- ReactOS – OS intended to run the same software as Windows, originally designed to simulate Windows NT 4.0, later aiming at Windows 7 compatibility. It has been in the development stage since 1996.

=== Emulation and Virtualization ===
- AppleWin
- DOSBox – DOS programs emulator (including PC games)
- GNOME Boxes
- Hercules (emulator)
- Kernel-based Virtual Machine (KVM)
- QEMU
- VirtualBox – hosted hypervisor for x86 virtualization

== Personal information managers ==
- Chandler – developed by the Open Source Applications Foundation (OSAF)
- KAddressBook
- Kontact
- KOrganizer
- Mozilla Calendar – Mozilla-based, multi-platform calendar program
- GNOME Evolution
- Perkeep – personal data store for pictures
- Project.net – commercial project management
- TeamLab – platform for project management and collaboration

== Programming ==
=== Programming languages ===
- ACL2
- Agda
- Groovy
- AssemblyScript
- asm.js
- Ballerina
- Bash
- Befunge
- Bosque
- C#
- Carbon
- Chapel
- CLISP
- Clojure
- CMU Common Lisp
- colorForth
- Crystal
- Curry
- Cython
- D
- Dafny
- Dart
- Dash
- Dylan
- Elixir
- Elm
- Embeddable Common Lisp
- Erlang
- F#
- F*
- Factor
- Fish
- Free Pascal
- Futhark
- Gforth
- Gleam
- GNU AWK
- GnuCOBOL
- GNU Data Language
- GNU Fortran
- Go
- Golo
- Gosu
- Hack
- Haskell
- Haxe
- Icon
- Idris
- Inform
- Io
- ISLISP
- J
- Java
- Julia
- Kotlin
- LiveScript
- Logo
- Lua
- Maclisp
- Malbolge
- Mercury
- MicroPython
- Mojo
- NetRexx
- Nim
- Nu
- Oberon
- Object REXX
- OCaml
- Perl
- Pharo
- PHP
- Pike
- Pony
- PowerShell
- Pure
- Pure Data
- PureScript
- Python
- R
- Racket
- Raku
- Reason
- Red
- ReScript
- Ring
- Ruby
- Rust
- Scala
- Seed7
- Smalltalk
- SNOBOL
- Solidity
- Steel Bank Common Lisp
- Swift
- SWI-Prolog
- Tcl
- TypeScript
- Umple
- V
- Vala
- WebAssembly
- Zig
- Z shell

=== Application frameworks ===
- Apache Cordova
- Avalonia UI
- Codename One
- .NET MAUI
- Eclipse Rich Client Platform
- Electron
- Flutter
- Griffon
- Ionic
- JavaFX
- JUCE
- Kivy
- Mozilla application framework
- NativeScript
- NetBeans Platform
- Qt
- React Native
- Tauri
- Titanium SDK
- Ultimate++
- Uno Platform
- Windows Forms
- Windows Presentation Foundation

=== Web frameworks ===
- Angular
- Django
- Ember.js
- Express.js
- Flask
- Laravel
- Next.js
- Ruby on Rails
- Spring Framework
- Svelte
- Vue.js
- web2py

=== Multimedia frameworks ===
- FFmpeg
- GPAC
- GStreamer
- Media Lovin' Toolkit
- Network-Integrated Multimedia Middleware
- Open Source Media Framework
- Phonon

=== Widget toolkits ===
- Abstract Window Toolkit
- Apache Pivot
- CEGUI
- Compose Multiplatform
- Enlightenment Foundation Libraries
- FLTK
- FOX toolkit
- Fyne
- GTK
- IUP
- Lazarus Component Library
- Motif
- Qt
- Shoes
- Standard Widget Toolkit
- Swing
- Tk
- Ultimate++
- Windows Template Library
- wxWidgets

=== Integrated development environments ===
- Aptana Studio
- Arduino IDE
- BlackBox Component Builder
- Bricx Command Center
- Code::Blocks
- CodeLite
- Dev-C++
- Dev-Pascal
- Eclipse
- Eclipse Theia
- eric
- Fresh
- Gambas
- Geany
- GNOME Builder
- GNU Octave IDE
- IDLE
- InForm
- KDevelop
- Lazarus
- MCU 8051 IDE
- NetBeans
- Padre
- Pharo
- Poplog
- PyDev
- Qt Creator
- SLIME
- Spyder
- TheIDE
- VisualFBEditor
- Warp
- ZeroBrane Studio

=== Source code editors ===
- Acme
- Atom
- Bluefish
- Brackets
- ECCE
- ed
- Elvis
- GNU Emacs
- Extensible Versatile Editor (EVE)
- FeatherPad
- Geany
- gedit
- GNOME Text Editor
- JED
- jEdit
- JOVE
- Jupyter Notebook
- Kate
- Kile
- Komodo Edit
- KWrite
- Lapis
- Language-Sensitive Editor (LSE)
- Leo
- Light Table
- MicroEMACS
- GNU nano
- Neovim
- Notepad++
- nvi
- SciTE
- Stevie
- Textadept
- TextMate
- Vi
- vile
- vim
- Visual Studio Code
- Xed
- XEmacs
- Zed

=== Compilers and assemblers ===
- Amsterdam Compiler Kit
- BBC BASIC
- Bigloo
- Blitz BASIC
- BDS C
- CINT
- Chez Scheme
- Chicken
- Clang
- Clozure CL
- CMU Common Lisp
- Cython
- EiffelStudio
- Embeddable Common Lisp
- Emscripten
- FASM
- Free Pascal
- FreeBASIC
- G95
- Gambas
- Gambit
- GNU Assembler
- GCC
- GNU Compiler for Java
- GNU Common Lisp
- GNU Fortran
- GNU Pascal
- GNU Smalltalk
- Glasgow Haskell
- High Level Assembly
- IL2CPU
- Ikarus
- IronRuby
- javac
- Jikes
- Kawa
- LCC
- LibertyEiffel
- LLVM
- MIT/GNU Scheme
- Mono compiler
- Netwide Assembler
- Nuitka
- Numba
- Open64
- PeachPie
- Phalanger
- Portable C
- Psyco
- QB64
- ROSE
- Roslyn
- rustc
- SCM
- Shed Skin
- Small-C
- Small Device C
- SmartEiffel
- Stalin
- Steel Bank Common Lisp
- TenDRA
- Tiny C
- Vector Pascal
- Watcom C/C++
- XPL
- YARV
- Yabasic
- York Haskell
- Zig Compiler

=== Relational database management systems ===
- Apache Derby
- Apache Ignite
- ClickHouse
- CrateDB
- CUBRID
- DuckDB
- Firebird
- Greenplum
- H2
- HSQLDB
- Infobright
- MariaDB
- MonetDB
- MySQL
- OpenLink Virtuoso
- Percona Server for MySQL
- Percona XtraDB Cluster
- PostgreSQL
- RethinkDB
- SQLite
- TiDB
- TimescaleDB
- Trafodion
- VoltDB
- YDB
- YugabyteDB

=== NoSQL database management systems ===
- Apache Accumulo
- Apache Cassandra
- Apache CouchDB
- Apache HBase
- Apache IoTDB
- ArangoDB
- Bitcask
- Blazegraph
- Couchbase Server
- FlockDB
- FoundationDB
- GUN
- Hypertable
- JanusGraph
- Neo4j
- OrientDB
- Rasdaman
- RethinkDB
- Riak
- ScyllaDB
- Tarantool
- TerminusDB
- TypeDB
- Valkey
- Virtuoso Universal Server

=== Bug trackers ===
- Bugzilla
- Mantis
- Mindquarry
- Redmine
- Trac

=== Debuggers ===
- GNU Data Display Debugger – graphical front end for command-line debuggers such as GDB
- GNU Debugger – portable debugger that runs on many Unix-like systems
- LLDB – debugger developed as part of the LLVM project

=== Dynamic analysis ===
- DTrace – dynamic tracing framework for analyzing and troubleshooting running applications and operating systems
- Memtest86 – stress-tests RAM on x86 machines
- strace – diagnostic utility for tracing system calls and signals
- Valgrind – debugging and profiling tool for detecting memory and threading errors
- Xnee – record and replay tests

=== Code generators ===
- Acceleo – model-to-text code generator
- Apache Velocity – Java-based template engine used for code generation
- Babel – JavaScript transcompiler
- Bison
- CodeSynthesis XSD – XML Data Binding compiler for C++
- CodeSynthesis XSD/e – validating XML parser/serializer and C++ XML Data Binding generator for mobile and embedded systems
- Flex lexical analyser – generates lexical analyzers
- Open Scene Graph – 3D graphics application programming interface
- OpenSCDP – Open Smart Card Development Platform
- SableCC – parser generator for Java and .NET
- SWIG – Simplified Wrapper and Interface Generator for several languages
- Umple – modeling and programming language with source code generation
- xmlbeansxx – XML Data Binding code generator for C++
- YAKINDU Statechart Tools – Statechart code generator for C++ and Java

=== Build automation, configuration, and dependency management ===
- Apache Ant
- Apache Maven
- ASDF
- Autoconf
- Automake
- Bazel
- BitBake
- Boot
- Buck
- Buildout
- Cabal
- Cargo
- CMake
- Composer
- Dub
- Gradle
- GNU Make
- Grunt
- Gulp
- Leiningen
- Make
- Meson
- Mix
- MSBuild
- NAnt
- Ninja
- npm
- pip
- pnpm
- Qbs
- Rake
- sbt
- SCons
- Stack
- vcpkg
- Vite
- Waf
- Yarn

=== JavaScript runtimes ===
- Bun
- Deno
- Node.js

=== Software testing ===
==== Unit testing frameworks ====
- CppUnit
- Google Test
- JUnit
- NUnit
- PHPUnit
- Pytest
- QUnit
- RSpec
- TestNG
- xUnit.net

==== Behavior-driven and acceptance testing ====
- Cucumber
- Robot Framework
- RSpec
- Selenium

==== GUI testing tools ====
- Appium
- AutoHotkey
- Linux Desktop Testing Project
- Playwright
- Robot Framework
- Sahi
- Selenium
- Watir
- Xnee

==== Test support tools ====
- Apache JMeter
- Mockito
- QuickCheck
- Test Anything Protocol
- Valgrind

==== Inspectors ====
- DOM Inspector
- Firebug

=== Static analysis and linting tools ===
- Checkstyle
- Coccinelle
- Cppcheck
- ESLint
- FindBugs
- Frama-C
- Infer
- JSHint
- lint
- PMD
- Pylint
- Semgrep
- Soot
- Sparse
- Splint
- Yasca

=== Containers and orchestration ===
- Docker
- Kubernetes
- Podman

=== Documentation generators ===
- Doxygen – tool for writing software reference documentation. The documentation is written within code
- Mkd – extracts software documentation from source code files, pseudocode, or comments
- Natural Docs

=== Version control systems ===
- Apache Allura
- Apache Subversion
- GNU Bazaar
- BitKeeper
- Breezy
- Cervisia
- Code Co-op
- Cogito
- Concurrent Versions System
- CVSNT
- Darcs
- Dat
- Forgejo
- Fossil
- Git
- Git-annex
- GNU arch
- Hgsubversion
- Kallithea
- Mercurial
- Monotone
- OpenGrok
- QVCS
- Revision Control System
- RhodeCode
- Source Code Control System
- SourcePuller
- TortoiseCVS
- TortoiseGit
- TortoiseHg
- TortoiseSVN
- Vesta

=== Configuration management and deployment ===
- Ansible
- Chef
- Puppet
- Salt

== Risk management ==
- Active Agenda – operational risk management and rapid application development platform

== Science ==
=== Bioinformatics ===
- AMAP
- BAli-Phy
- BLAST, CS-BLAST, BLAT
- Bowtie
- Clustal
- DECIPHER
- FASTA
- Fast statistical alignment
- HMMER
- HH-suite
- JAligner
- MAFFT
- MAVID
- MUSCLE
- Nextflow
- Phyloscan
- Probalign
- ProbCons
- Stemloc
- T-Coffee
- UGENE
- Yass

==== Bioinformatics libraries and toolkits ====
- Biopython
- BioPerl
- BioRuby
- BioJava

=== Biology ===
==== Systems and cellular biology ====
- COPASI
- Systems Biology Simulation Core Library
- Virtual Cell
- CellProfiler
- ImageJ

==== Molecular and structural biology ====
- PyMOL
- Jmol
- AlphaFold

==== Population and evolutionary biology ====
- BEAST 2
- MrBayes

=== Computational chemistry ===
- ABINIT
- BigDFT
- CP2K
- Dalton
- DIRAC
- FLEUR
- FreeON
- MADNESS
- Massively parallel quantum chemistry
- MOLCAS
- MOPAC
- NWChem
- Octopus
- PARSEC
- PLATO
- PSI4
- PySCF
- Qbox
- Quantum ESPRESSO
- SIESTA
- YAMBO

==== Molecular dynamics ====
- Advanced Simulation Library
- BALL
- Biskit
- Car–Parrinello molecular dynamics
- GROMACS
- LAMMPS
- NAMD
- Newton-X
- OpenAtom
- OpenMM
- RMG

==== Molecular modeling ====
- AlphaFold
- APBS
- AutoDock
- Avogadro
- BALL
- Coot
- CP2K
- CS-ROSETTA
- ECCE
- Folding@home
- Jmol
- MODELLER
- Molecular Modelling Toolkit
- Molekel
- NUPACK
- QuteMol
- RasMol
- ShelXle
- Chimera
- VMD
- VOTCA

==== Cheminformatics & docking ====
- Avogadro
- Biskit
- Chemistry Development Kit
- Gabedit
- Ghemical
- JOELib
- Open Babel
- RDKit
- SHELX

==== Utilities / frameworks ====
- Cantera
- CASINO
- CONQUEST
- DP code
- EXC code
- FDMNES
- Internal Coordinate Mechanics
- OctaDist
- Spinach

=== Data science ===
- Apache Flink – stream and batch data processing framework
- Apache Hadoop – distributed storage and processing framework
- Apache Mahout – scalable machine learning library
- Apache Spark – unified analytics engine
- Dask – parallel computing for analytics in Python
- ELKI – data analysis algorithms library
- GNU Octave – numerical computing environment
- JASP – GUI program for data analytics, data science, and machine learning
- Jupyter Notebook – interactive computing
- Keras – neural network library
- KNIME – data analytics platform
- Matplotlib – data visualization library
- MLlib – machine learning library for Apache Spark
- NumPy – numerical computing library
- Orange – data mining tool
- pandas – data manipulation library
- PyTorch – machine learning and deep learning framework
- Python
- R – statistical computing language
- SageMath – mathematics and data analysis environment
- SciPy – scientific computing library
- scikit-learn – Python machine learning library
- TensorFlow – machine learning framework
- WEKA – machine learning and data analysis suite

=== Electronic lab notebooks ===
- Jupyter

=== Geoscience ===
- Generic Mapping Tools
- GPlates
- GSSHA
- Madagascar
- SAGA GIS
- Seismic Unix

=== Materials science ===
- ABINIT
- CP2K
- Elmer FEM solver
- LAMMPS
- MOOSE
- NWChem
- Octopus
- OpenKIM
- OpenMX
- Quantum ESPRESSO
- SIESTA

=== Grid computing ===
- 3G Bridge – grid interoperability
- Advanced Resource Connector – middleware
- BOINC – volunteer computing
- HTCondor – high-throughput computing
- Simple Grid Protocol – grid computing
- UNICORE – middleware

=== Microscope image processing ===
- CellProfiler – automatic microscopic analysis, aimed at individuals lacking training in computer vision
- Endrov – Java-based plugin architecture designed to analyse complex spatio-temporal image data
- Fiji – imageJ-based image processing
- Gwyddion – scanning probe microscopy data visualization and processing
- Ilastik – image-classification and segmentation software
- ImageJ – image processing application developed at the National Institutes of Health
- IMOD – 2D and 3D analysis of electron microscopy data
- ITK – development framework used for creation of image segmentation and registration programs
- KNIME – data analytics, reporting, and integration platform
- VTK – C++ toolkit for 3D computer graphics, image processing, and visualisation
- 3DSlicer – medical image analysis and visualisation

=== Molecular design software ===
- Ascalaph Designer
- Winmostar

=== Molecular dynamics ===
- GROMACS – protein, lipid, and nucleic acid simulation
- LAMMPS – molecular dynamics software
- MDynaMix – general-purpose molecular dynamics, simulating mixtures of molecules
- ms2 – molecular dynamics and Monte Carlo simulation package to predict thermophysical properties of fluids
- NWChem – wuantum chemical and molecular dynamics software

=== Molecule editors ===
- Ascalaph Designer
- Avogadro
- Gabedit
- JChemPaint
- Kekulé Program
- XDrawChem

=== Molecular graphics systems ===
- Avogadro
- BALL
- Gabedit
- Jmol
- Molekel
- PyMOL
- RasMol

=== Molecular mechanics modeling ===
- Avogadro
- CP2K
- GROMACS
- LAMMPS
- MDynaMix
- ms2
- OpenMM
- Orac
- NWChem
- Q
- Quantum ESPRESSO

=== Molecular structure ===
- Chemfig
- JChemPaint
- XDrawChem
- XyMTeX

=== Molecule viewer ===
- Avogadro – plugin-extensible molecule visualisation
- BALLView – molecular modeling and visualisation
- Jmol – 3D representation of molecules in many formats, for teaching use
- Molekel – molecule viewing software
- MeshLab – able to import PDB dataset and build up surfaces from them
- PyMOL – high-quality representations of small molecules and biological macromolecules
- QuteMol – interactive molecule representations offering an array of innovative OpenGL visual effects
- RasMol – visualizes biological macromolecules

=== Nanotechnology ===
- nanoHUB
- Ninithi – visualise and analyse carbon allotropes, such as carbon nanotube, Fullerene, graphene nanoribbons

=== Nuclear Fusion Engineering ===
- OpenMC

=== Plotting ===
- Veusz

=== Quantum chemistry ===
- CP2K – atomistic and molecular simulation of solid-state, liquid, molecular, and biological systems

== Screensavers ==
- BOINC
- Electric Sheep
- XScreenSaver

== Simulation software ==
- List of free and open source simulation software

== Theology ==
=== Bible study tools ===
- Go Bible – free Bible viewer application for Java mobile phones
- Marcion – Coptic–English/Czech dictionary
- OpenLP – worship presentation program licensed under the GNU General Public License
- The SWORD Project – CrossWire Bible Society's free software project

== Web conferencing ==
- Jitsi Meet
- OpenMeetings
- Conference XP
- Jami
- BigBlueButton

== See also ==
- Open-source software
- Open-source license
- Comparison of file synchronization software § Open-source
- GNOME Core Applications
- List of concept- and mind-mapping software § Free and open-source
- List of formerly proprietary software
- List of GNU packages
- List of HDL simulators § Free and open-source simulators
- List of KDE applications
- List of open-source hardware projects
- List of optimization software § Free and open-source software
- List of public domain projects
- List of spreadsheet software § Free and open-source software
- List of Unix commands

=== General directories ===
- AlternativeTo
- CodePlex
- Free Software Directory
- Freecode
- Open Hub
- SourceForge

=== Open-source organizations ===
- AlmaLinux OS Foundation
- Apache Software Foundation
- Blender Foundation
- Center for Open Science
- Cloud Native Computing Foundation
- Debian
- Eclipse Foundation
- FLISOL
- FreeBSD Foundation
- Free Software Foundation
- Free Software Foundation Europe
- GNOME Foundation
- Jasig
- KDE e.V.
- Khronos Group
- Linux Australia
- Linux Foundation
- Lyrasis
- MariaDB Foundation
- Mozilla Foundation
- NetBSD Foundation
- .NET Foundation
- Open Compute Project
- OpenForum Europe
- OpenJS Foundation
- Open Source Geospatial Foundation
- Open Source Hardware Association
- Open Source Initiative
- OpenStack
- OW2
- Perl Foundation
- Python Software Foundation
- R Foundation for Statistical Computing
- Red Hat
- Rust Foundation
- Software Freedom Conservancy
- Software in the Public Interest
- The Document Foundation
- Wikimedia Foundation
- WordPress Foundation
- X.Org Foundation
