= Feh =

Feh or variants may refer to:

== Language ==
- Feh (letter), a variant of pe, 17th letter of the Semitic scripts
- Feh (interjection), in Yiddish

== Other uses ==
- Feh (image viewer), command-line software
- Iron(I) hydride (chemical formula: FeH)
- Fire Emblem Heroes, a 2017 mobile video game by Nintendo
