= OpenX =

OpenX may refer to:

- OpenX (company) - OpenX Software Ltd., a SSP advertising company based in Pasadena, California
- OpenX (software) - an open-source ad server software package, previously known as "phpAdsNew" and "OpenAds"
- OpenX (mount), a 3D printer extruder mount
