= MIFF =

MIFF may refer to:

== Film festivals ==
- Listapad, aka Minsk International Film Festival, held each November in Minsk, Belarus
- Maine International Film Festival, held in Waterville, Maine
- Melbourne International Film Festival, held in Melbourne, Australia
- Méliès International Festivals Federation, a network of 22 genre film festivals based in Brussels, Belgium
- Miami International Film Festival, held in Miami, Florida, US
- Milan International Film Festival, held in Milan, Italy
- Monaco International Film Festival, held in Monaco
- Montreal Independent Film Festival, held in Montreal, Canada
- Moscow International Film Festival, held in Moscow, Russia
- Mumbai International Film Festival, held in Mumbai, India

== Other uses ==
- Magick Image File Format, a digital image format
- MIFF mine, a German anti-tank mine
- Miff Mole (1898–1961), American jazz trombonist and band leader
- With Israel for Peace, a Norwegian pro-Israel organisation (Norwegian: Med Israel for fred)
