= Sweet Home 3D =

Interior design software

Sweet Hoome 3D
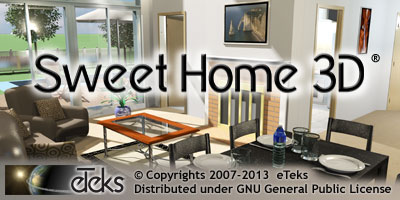
- Developer: Space Mushrooms
- Release: November 16, 2006; 19 years ago
- Stable release: 7.5 / August 21, 2024; 2 years ago
- Written in: Java
- Operating system: Linux, Mac OS X, Solaris and Windows
- Size: 84.8 MB Windows; 291 MB Mac OS X 75 MB Linux (32-bit); 71.7 MB Linux (64-bit); 47.4 MB Java
- Available in: Multilingual
- Type: CAD, CAAD, CAE
- License: GNU General Public License
- Website: www.sweethome3d.com/

Sweet Home 3D is a free and open source architectural design software that helps users create a 2D plan of a house, with a 3D preview, and decorate exterior and interior views, including ability to place furniture and home appliances. In Sweet Home 3D, furniture can be imported and arranged to create a virtual environment. It can also be used for designing blueprints of houses.

== Features ==
- Import home blueprint from scanned image
- Export to PDF, SVG, and OBJ

== Gallery ==
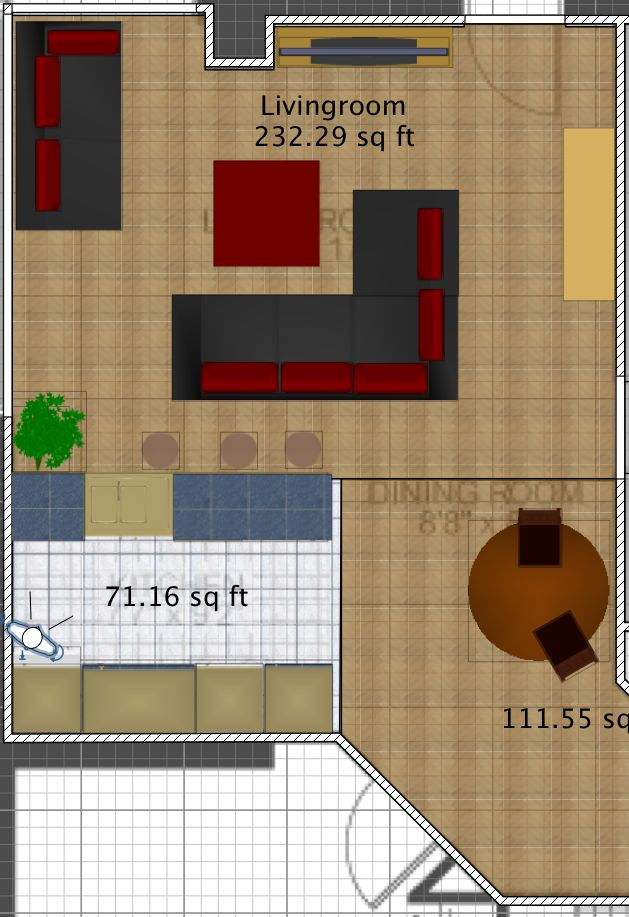
Layout

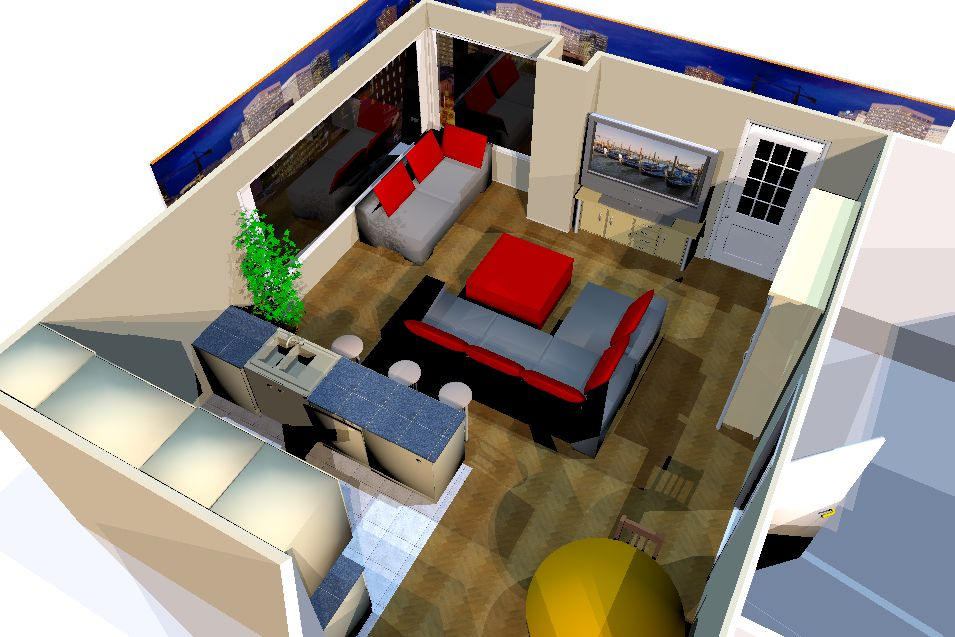
3D view

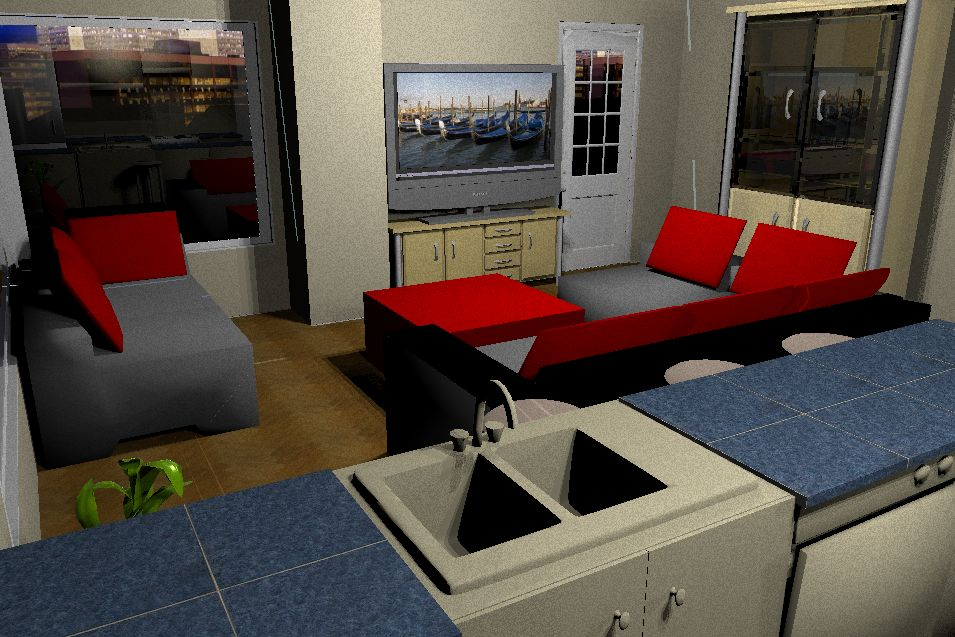
Render

== See also ==
- List of free and open source CAD software
