= Ms2 (software) =

Molecular simulation program

ms2
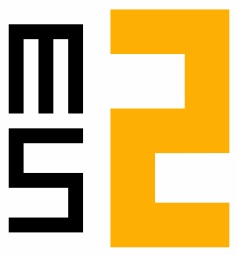
- Original authors: Colin W. Glass, Steffen Reiser, Gábor Rutkai, Stephan Deublein, Andreas Köster, Gabriela Guevara-Carrion, Amer Wafai, Martin Horsch, Martin Bernreuther, Thorsten Windmann, Kai Langenbach, David Celny, Sergei Prokopev, Isabel Nitzke, Thorsten Merker, Stephan Deublein, Bernhard Eckl, Jürgen Stoll, Sergey V. Lishchuk, Denis Saric, Joshua Marx, Tatjana Janzen, Michael Schappals, Robin Fingerhut, Maximilian Kohns, Simon Stephan, Hans Hasse, Jadran Vrabec
- Developers: OVGU Magdeburg, TU Berlin, HLRS Stuttgart
- Release: 2011; 15 years ago
- Stable release: 01 May 2021 / May 29, 2021; 5 years ago
- Written in: Fortran
- Operating system: Linux, macOS, Windows
- Platform: x86, x86-64
- Size: 250 MB
- Available in: English
- Type: Molecular dynamics, Monte Carlo
- License: Creative commons CC by NC 3.0
- Website: ms2.moltherm-computation.com
- Repository: github.com/moltherm-computation/ms2

ms2 is a non-commercial molecular simulation program. It comprises both molecular dynamics and Monte Carlo simulation algorithms. ms2 is designed for the calculation of thermodynamic properties of fluids. A large number of thermodynamic properties can be readily computed using ms2, e.g. phase equilibrium, transport and caloric properties. ms2 is limited to homogeneous state simulations.

== Features ==
ms2 contains two molecular simulation techniques: molecular dynamics (MD) and Monte-Carlo. ms2 supports the calculation of vapor-liquid equilibria of pure components as well as multi-component mixtures. Different Phase equilibrium calculation methods are implemented in ms2. Furthermore, ms2 is capable of sampling various classical ensembles such as NpT, NVE, NVT, NpH. To evaluate the chemical potential, Widom's test molecule method and thermodynamic integration are implemented. Also, algorithms for the sampling of transport properties are implemented in ms2. Transport properties are determined by equilibrium MD simulations following the Green-Kubo formalism and the Einstein formalism.

== Applications ==
ms2 has been frequently used for predicting thermophysical properties of fluids for chemical engineering applications as well as for scientific computing and soft matter physics. It has been used for modelling both model fluids as well as real substances. A large number interaction potentials are implemented in ms2, e.g. the Lennard-Jones potential, the Mie potential, electrostatic interactions (point charges, point dipoles and point quadrupoles), and external forces. Force fields from databases such as the MolMod database can readily be used in ms2.

== See also ==
- Comparison of software for molecular mechanics modeling
- List of Monte Carlo simulation software
- List of free and open-source software packages
