= AlternativeTo =

Software alternatives website

- Screenshot of AlternativeTo.net
- Website type: Software directory
- Owner: 27 Kilobyte AB
- Creators: Ola Johansson and Markus Olausson
- Website: alternativeto.net
- Registration: Optional
- Launched: 2009

AlternativeTo is a website which lists alternatives to web-based software, desktop computer software, and mobile apps, and sorts the alternatives by various criteria, including the number of registered users who have "Liked" each of them on AlternativeTo.

Users can search the site to find better alternatives to an application they are using or previously have used, including free alternatives such as free web applications (cloud computing) which don't require any installation and can be accessed from any browser.

== Differences ==
Unlike a number of other software directory websites, the software is not arranged into categories, but each individual piece of software has its own list of alternatives. However, users can also search by tag to find software, which offers an alternative way of finding related software. Users can also narrow their search by focusing on particular platforms and license types (such as "free for non-commercial use").

AlternativeTo lists basic information such as platform and license type at the top of each entry, but does not have comparison tables listing software features side by side.

AlternativeTo does not host software for download but it provides links to official websites to where you can download or buy them.

AlternativeTo allows anyone to register and suggest new alternatives, or to update the information held about existing entries. Suggestions and alterations are reviewed before being made publicly visible. Users can register using either email and password or OpenID. Login with Facebook has been discontinued.

As AlternativeTo is itself a web application, it even has a page for alternatives to itself.

== Features ==
Tweets from anyone mentioning particular pieces of software are also pulled in dynamically from Twitter. Each application has an RSS feed for notifying users of newly listed alternatives to that application. After a user has clicked the Like button next to an application, they are offered the opportunity to tell their friends on Facebook or their followers on Twitter that they liked it.

The site also has a forum. For software developers, a JSON API used to be available, but has been taken down indefinitely.

== See also ==
- Open Hub
- ProgrammableWeb
- Open Directory Project
- Product Hunt
- Free Software Directory
