= TurboCASH =

Free accounting software package

- Developers: Pink Software & Delphidreams.
- Initial release: April 1985
- Stable release: 5.0.0.969 / 16 August 2016; 9 years ago
- Written in: Delphi
- Operating system: Windows
- Type: Accounting
- License: GPL
- Website: www.turbocash.net

TurboCASH is an accounting software package, developed by a project team headed by Philip Copeman, a South African. It has been continuously developed since April 1985, and was released under the GNU General Public License in July 2003. As of version 5, the software requires an annual subscription fee, therefore making it commercial once again.

TurboCASH is aimed at the small to medium-sized business market, placing it between a home finances package and an ERP package. Its core functions are a general ledger, posting transactions into accounts, and producing financial reports. Plugin technology enables developers to extend the system.

TurboCASH integrates through tab delimited imports and exports. Developed with Delphi, it runs natively on Windows, and a version has been released that runs under Wine for Linux. A version for CrossOver is also under development for MacOS.

== Adoption ==
According to the company, TurboCASH has a community of over 120,000 users. TurboCASH communities are found in South Africa, the Netherlands, the United Kingdom, Belgium, United States, Canada, India, Indonesia and Australia. It has been translated or partially translated into 23 languages including Afrikaans, Croatian, Dutch, Greek, Indonesian and Spanish.

== Criticism ==
TurboCASH versions prior to 5.0 utilize a Paradox/BDE database, criticized because of its age and slowness. Its developers claim that in a network of one to five users, TurboCASH's target market, Paradox/BDE works well and has a long record of stability and easy installation. Version 5.0 is based on the Firebird database, alleviating this criticism.

TurboCASH 4 claims to be open-source, the last source code release is 5 January 2018. TurboCASH 4 is also criticized by some open-source advocates, as proprietary applications are required to compile TurboCASH 4. A project to implement the system in Javascript is underway.

== See also ==
- Comparison of accounting software
- GnuCash
- List of free and open-source software packages
