= RustGIS =

RustGIS is a free and open source GIS for mapping and analysing GIS data. It is programmed in Rust. It runs natively on Windows, macOS and Linux and can run in web browsers also. While using it on a web browser, data from local machine can be added and manipulated along with data available on cloud; analysis results (maps, graphs etc.) can be saved as output on both the locations.
