= Open Movie Editor =

- Developer: Richard Spindler
- Initial release: December 23, 2005
- Final release: 0.0.20090105 / January 5, 2009; 17 years ago
- Written in: C++
- Operating system: Unix-like
- Type: Video editor
- License: GNU General Public License
- Website: www.openmovieeditor.org

Open Movie Editor is a free open-source non-linear video editing and post-processing program for Linux, and included in the Ubuntu and Debian repositories.

Per the website, the design intent is "for basic movie making capabilities. It aims to be powerful enough for the amateur movie artist, yet easy to use." The developer previously had worked on the Cinelerra project, but started the Open Movie Editor project when he started making amateur films because he felt the available software wasn't meeting his needs.

A unique feature of Open Movie Editor is that it supports JACK's transport control functionality, which allows you to synchronize sound with other JACK transport-aware apps. This makes it particularly powerful for soundtrack production, for example. Open Movie Editor supports the Frei0r plugin framework for video and audio effects. It uses the Gmerlin audio/video library and primarily exports to QuickTime formats, but will also natively use ffmpeg for rendering options. It natively supports the DV AVI Type 2 format, which is also supported by a number of video editing applications for Windows.

Its last release to date is dated 05 Jan 2009. The developer announced 08 Dec 2009 on his blog that he had to "reschedule OME into a lower priority class," putting the project seemingly in the same situation as CineFX and Kino.

Movie editor could also be used as a source for editing videos.

== See also ==
- Comparison of video editing software
- List of video editing software
