= IpTables Rope =

Rope is a programming language that allows developers to write extensions to the Iptables/Netfilter components of Linux using a simple scripting language based on Reverse Polish notation.

It is a scriptable Iptables match module, used to identify whether IP packets passed to it match a particular set of criteria or not. Rope started life as a project to make the "string" match module of Iptables stronger and evolved fairly quickly into an open-ended scriptable packet matching mechanism.
