= Project Chrono =

Computer physics engine

- Developers: Alessandro Tasora, Radu Serban, Dan Negrut et al.
- Initial release: 1998; 28 years ago
- Stable release: 10.0.0 / March 27, 2026; 0 days' time
- Written in: C, C++
- Operating system: Linux, Microsoft Windows, macOS
- Type: Multi-physics engine
- License: BSD License
- Website: projectchrono.org
- Repository: github.com/projectchrono/chrono

Project Chrono is a physics engine developed by University of Parma, University of Wisconsin-Madison and members of its open source community. It supports simulating rigid and soft body dynamics, collision detection, vehicle dynamics, fluid-solid interaction (SPH, TDPF), deformable terrain, and granular dynamics, among other physical systems. The latest developments are in the area of sensor simulation, robotics simulation, human-autonomous agent interaction (real-time simulation), and autonomous vehicle simulation, where the emphasis is on off-road scenarios. Parts of the code run on the GPU, multi-core CPUs, and distributed memory architectures via MPI. It is used at tens of universities, in industry, and federal research labs.

The project is under active development, current project sponsors include the US Army Research Office, National Science Foundation, Department of Defense, and Department of Transportation. Project Chrono is used by the US Army for simulating wheeled and tracked vehicles.

== History ==
Project Chrono was initially developed for use as a multibody simulation tool for robotics and biomechanics applications by Alessandro Tasora while a student at the Polytechnic University of Milan. This became a joint University of Wisconsin-University of Parma project as of 2008.

The project was released under a BSD License in 2013.

In 2014 the United States Army invested US$1,800,000 to fund the library's development over a two-year period.

In 2025, the National Science Foundation invested US$657,210 to fund the cybertraining for expanding the use of digital twin technologies in robotics using Project Chrono.

== Integration ==
Project Chrono can interact with a wide range of software and programming languages.

- PyChrono provides SWIG-based Python bindings, allowing users to call Project Chrono functions directly from Python and integrate seamlessly with other Python frameworks such as NumPy and TensorFlow.
- ChronoCSharp offers SWIG-based C# bindings, enabling the use of Project Chrono within C#. This functionality also serves as the foundation for Chrono-Unity integration.
- ChronoBlender is an add-on tool for the widespread Blender modeling and rendering software. Thanks to this add-on, users can generate high quality photorealistic animations of Chrono simulations.
- ChronoSolidwork is an add-in tool that allows to model complex mechanisms using the powerful SolidWorks 3D CAD software. The user can create mechanisms with mouse and 3D interface, then a description file can be output from SolidWorks and load in a C++ or Python program.
