= Simple Grid Protocol =

- Developer: Brendan Kosowski
- Initial release: September 23, 2004; 21 years ago
- Stable release: 1.2 / September 5, 2019; 6 years ago
- Operating system: Linux & BSD
- Available in: Steel Bank Common Lisp
- Type: Grid Computing
- License: Permissive software license
- Website: grid.bmk.com.au

Simple Grid Protocol is a free open source grid computing package. Developed & maintained by Brendan Kosowski, the package includes the protocol & software tools needed to get a computational grid up and running on Linux & BSD.

Coded in SBCL (Steel Bank Common Lisp), Simple Grid Protocol allows computer programs to utilize the unused CPU resources of other computers on a network or the Internet.

As of version 1.2, Simple Grid Protocol can execute multiple programming threads on multiple computers concurrently. Custom multi-threading functions (utilizing operating system threads) for Linux & BSD allow multi-threading on single-thread SBCL implementations. Originally coded in CLISP, version 1.2 included the change to SBCL coding.

BSD Operating Systems supported include FreeBSD, NetBSD, OpenBSD & DragonFly BSD.

An optional XML interface allows any XML capable programming language to send Lisp programs to the grid for execution.
