= Phyloscan =

- Developer(s): Wadsworth Center, New York State Department of Health
- Initial release: March 14, 2005
- Stable release: 2.2 / January 28, 2010
- Platform: web service
- Available in: English
- Type: Bioinformatics tool
- Website: https://ccmbweb.ccv.brown.edu/cgi-bin/phyloscanV2.pl

Phyloscan is a web service for DNA sequence analysis that is free and open to all users (without login requirement). For locating matches to a user-specified sequence motif for a regulatory binding site, Phyloscan provides a statistically sensitive scan of user-supplied mixed aligned and unaligned DNA sequence data. Phyloscan's strength is that it brings together

- the Staden method for computing statistical significance,
- the "phylogenetic motif model" scanning functionality of the MONKEY software that models evolutionary relationships among aligned sequences,
- the use of the Bailey & Gribskov method for combining statistics across non-aligned sequence data, and
- the Neuwald & Green technique for combining statistics across multiple binding sites found within a single gene promoter region.
