= Hgsubversion =

hgsubversion is an extension for Mercurial that allows using Mercurial as a Subversion client. It has been chosen by the Python developers as the preferred method for transitioning from Subversion to Mercurial as their version control system, once it is production quality.

hgsubversion was initially written by Augie Fackler and has been publicly developed since September 2008. It is distributed under the GPL version 2 and is free and open-source software.
