= CPMP-Tools =

CPMP-Tools is a free open-source software-package for Computer Algebra System (CAS). CPMP is an abbreviation for Core-Plus Mathematics Project. CPMP-Tools is released under the GNU General Public License. It works with three operating systems. CPMP-Tools is made for teaching mathematics at the high school level.

CPMP-Tools is a little similar to the two free CAS-software packages, Yacas and Xcas.

CPMP-Tools is Java-based.

== Operating systems ==
CPMP-Tools works for these operating systems:

- Microsoft Windows
- Apple macOS
- Linux

== Components ==
CPMP-Tools contains four parts:

- Algebra Tools is computer algebra system (CAS) and spreadsheet
- Geometry Tools is used for drawing geometric figures
- Statistics Tools can build a uni- or bivariate diagram
- Discrete Math is for mathematical modeling

== Features ==
- factoring polynomial: factor(
- solve equation: solve(
- calculate derivative: diff(
- calculate antiderivative: int(
- Perform Chi-squared test
- Draw graph of mathematical function.

== History ==
American mathematics teacher Brian Lemmen was involved in the development of CPMP-Tools. CPMP-Tools was first published in the 1990s.
