= TARDIS (software) =

TARDIS, Temperature And Radiative Diffusion In Supernovae, is an open-source 1D Monte Carlo radiative-transfer spectral synthesis program used for numerical modelling and analysis of supernovae.
