= MPMC =

Free simulation software package

Massively Parallel Monte Carlo
- MPMC logo
- Original authors: Jon Belof (currently at Lawrence Livermore National Laboratory), MPMC development team, University of South Florida
- Developer: University of South Florida
- Release: 2007; 19 years ago
- Written in: C, C++
- Operating system: Linux, macOS, all Unix
- Platform: IA-32, x86-64, NVidia CUDA
- Available in: English
- Type: Monte Carlo simulation
- License: GPL 3
- Website: code.google.com/p/mpmc/
- Repository: github.com/mpmccode/mpmc

Massively Parallel Monte Carlo (MPMC) is a Monte Carlo method package primarily designed to simulate liquids, molecular interfaces, and functionalized nanoscale materials. It was developed originally by Jon Belof and is now maintained by a group of researchers in the Department of Chemistry and SMMARTT Materials Research Center at the University of South Florida. MPMC has been applied to the scientific research challenges of nanomaterials for clean energy, carbon sequestration, and molecular detection. Developed to run efficiently on the most powerful supercomputing platforms, MPMC can scale to extremely large numbers of CPUs or GPUs (with support provided for NVidia's CUDA architecture). Since 2012, MPMC has been released as an open-source software project under the GNU General Public License (GPL) version 3, and the repository is hosted on GitHub.

== History ==
MPMC was originally written by Jon Belof (then at the University of South Florida) in 2007 for applications toward the development of nanomaterials for hydrogen storage. Since then MPMC has been released as an open source project and been extended to include a number of simulation methods relevant to statistical physics. The code is now further maintained by a group of researchers (Christian Cioce, Keith McLaughlin, Brant Tudor, Adam Hogan and Brian Space) in the Department of Chemistry and SMMARTT Materials Research Center at the University of South Florida.

== Features ==
MPMC is optimized for the study of nanoscale interfaces. MPMC supports simulation of Coulomb and Lennard-Jones systems, many-body polarization, coupled-dipole van der Waals, quantum rotational statistics, semi-classical quantum effects, advanced importance sampling methods relevant to fluids, and numerous tools for the development of intermolecular potentials. The code is designed to efficiently run on high-performance computing resources, including the network of some of the most powerful supercomputers in the world made available through the National Science Foundation supported project Extreme Science and Engineering Discovery Environment (XSEDE).

== Applications ==
MPMC has been applied to the scientific challenges of discovering nanomaterials for clean energy applications, capturing and sequestering carbon dioxide, designing tailored organometallic materials for chemical weapons detection, and quantum effects in cryogenic hydrogen for spacecraft propulsion. Also simulated and published have been the solid, liquid, supercritical, and gaseous states of matter of nitrogen (N_{2}) and carbon dioxide (CO_{2}).

== See also ==
- Statistical physics
- Monte Carlo method in statistical physics
- Metropolis–Hastings algorithm
- Simulated annealing
- Direct simulation Monte Carlo
- Dynamic Monte Carlo method
- Kinetic Monte Carlo
- List of software for Monte Carlo molecular modeling
- Comparison of software for molecular mechanics modeling
