= MyDLP =

Data loss prevention solution

- Initial release: Nov 16, 2009
- Repository: github.com/mydlp
- Written in: Erlang, Java, C++, C#, Adobe Flex
- Available in: English
- Type: Data Loss Prevention
- License: GNU General Public License
- Website: mydlp.com

MyDLP is a data loss prevention solution originally available released as free and open source software. Supported data inspection channels include web, mail, instant messaging, file transfer to removable storage devices and printers. The MyDLP development project originally made its source code available under the terms of the GNU General Public License.

MyDLP was one of the first free software projects for data loss prevention, but was acquired by the Comodo Group in May 2014. Comodo has since begun marketing the Enterprise version through its Comodo Security Solutions subsidiary, while the free version has been removed from the website. The open source code has not been updated since early 2014.

== Subprojects ==
As of October 2010, MyDLP included the following subprojects:

- MyDLP Network: Network server of the project, which was used for high load network operations such as intercepting TCP connections and hosting MyDLP network services.
- MyDLP Endpoint: Remote agent of the project, which ran on endpoint machines in order to inspect end user operations such as copying a file to an external device, printing a document and capturing screenshots.
- MyDLP Web UI: Management interface for system administrators to configure MyDLP. It pushed relevant parts of system configuration to both MyDLP Network and MyDLP Endpoint.

== Platforms and interfaces ==
MyDLP Network was mostly written in Erlang, because of its performance on concurrent network operations. Python was also used for a few exceptional cases. This subsystem could run on any platform that supported Erlang and Python.

MyDLP Endpoint was developed for Windows platforms, and it was written in C++, C#.

MyDLP Web UI was written in PHP and Adobe Flex. It used MySQL in order to store user configurations.

== Features ==
As of October 2010, MyDLP included widespread data loss prevention features such as text extraction from binary formats, incident management queue, source code detection and data identification methods for bank account, credit card and several national identification numbers. Besides, features like data classification through statistical analysis of trained sentences and native language processor integrated Naive Bayes classifier were claimed to be included.
