= 1DayLater =

Time-tracking and invoicing software

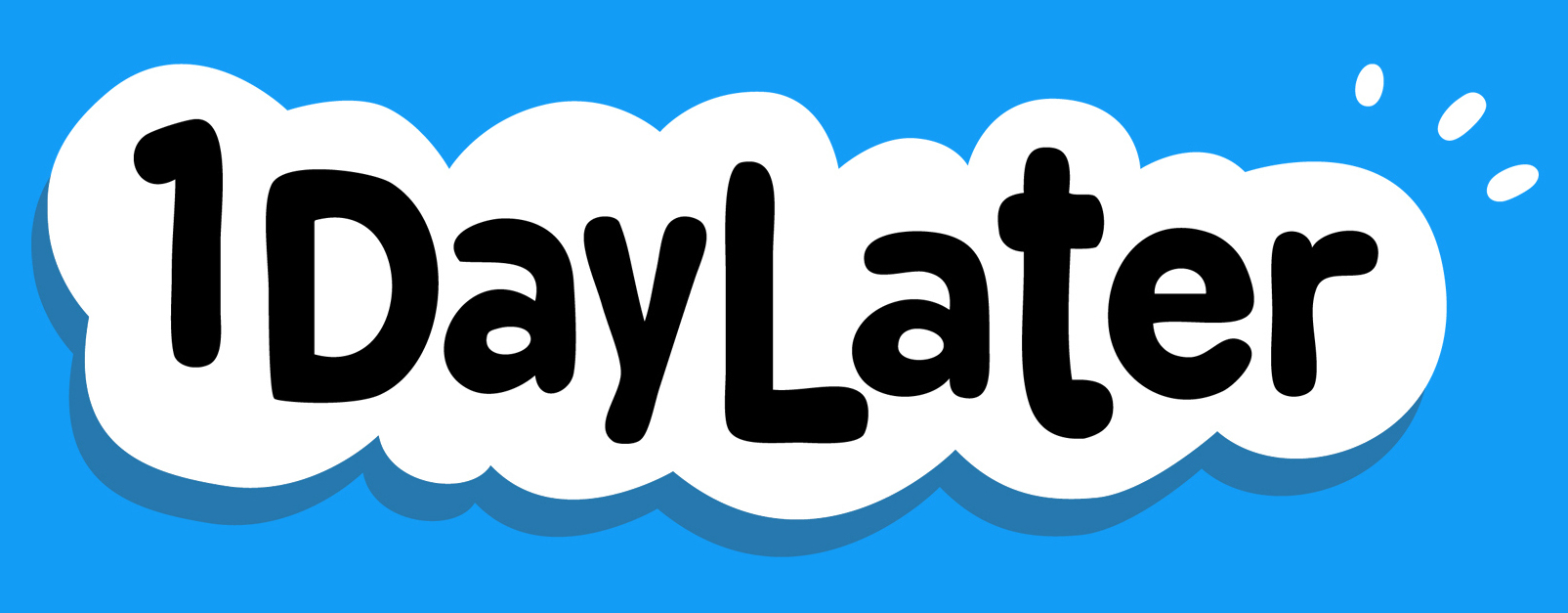
- Developer(s): 1DayLater Ltd
- Operating system: Web-based
- Type: Time tracking, Invoicing, Productivity, Billing
- Website: 1DayLater.com

1DayLater was a free, web-based software that was focused on professional invoicing. The company was formed in 2009 and closed in October 2013.

The main function of 1DayLater was to help users create invoices for clients. It could also be used to track time and other expenses, work to budgets, and to track projects. Multiple users could simultaneously work on the same projects together.

PC Magazine (PCMag) voted 1DayLater as one of the 'Best Free Software of 2010'.

== History ==
The software was developed by two brothers, Paul and David King; after they experienced similar frustrations while working freelance, the brothers wanted to create a product that would let them track time, expenses and business miles in a single online location.

== Media coverage ==
1DayLater had the following press coverage:

- BBC Webscape (July 2010) - Kate Russell gives her latest selection of the best sites on the World Wide Web
- PCMag (March 2010) - The best free software of 2010
- Lifehacker (February 2010) - "A worthy addition to our 'Top Ten Tips and Tools for Freelancers'"
- Gigaom (February 2010) - Taking a closer look with 1DayLater
- The Journal (May 2009) - "Top Ten Brands of the North East" (UK)
- Techcrunch (January 2009) - "A 'feisty time tracking solution from the North East of England'"

== See also ==
- Productivity
- Comparison of time-tracking software
- Software
