= MCU 8051 IDE =

Software integrated development environment

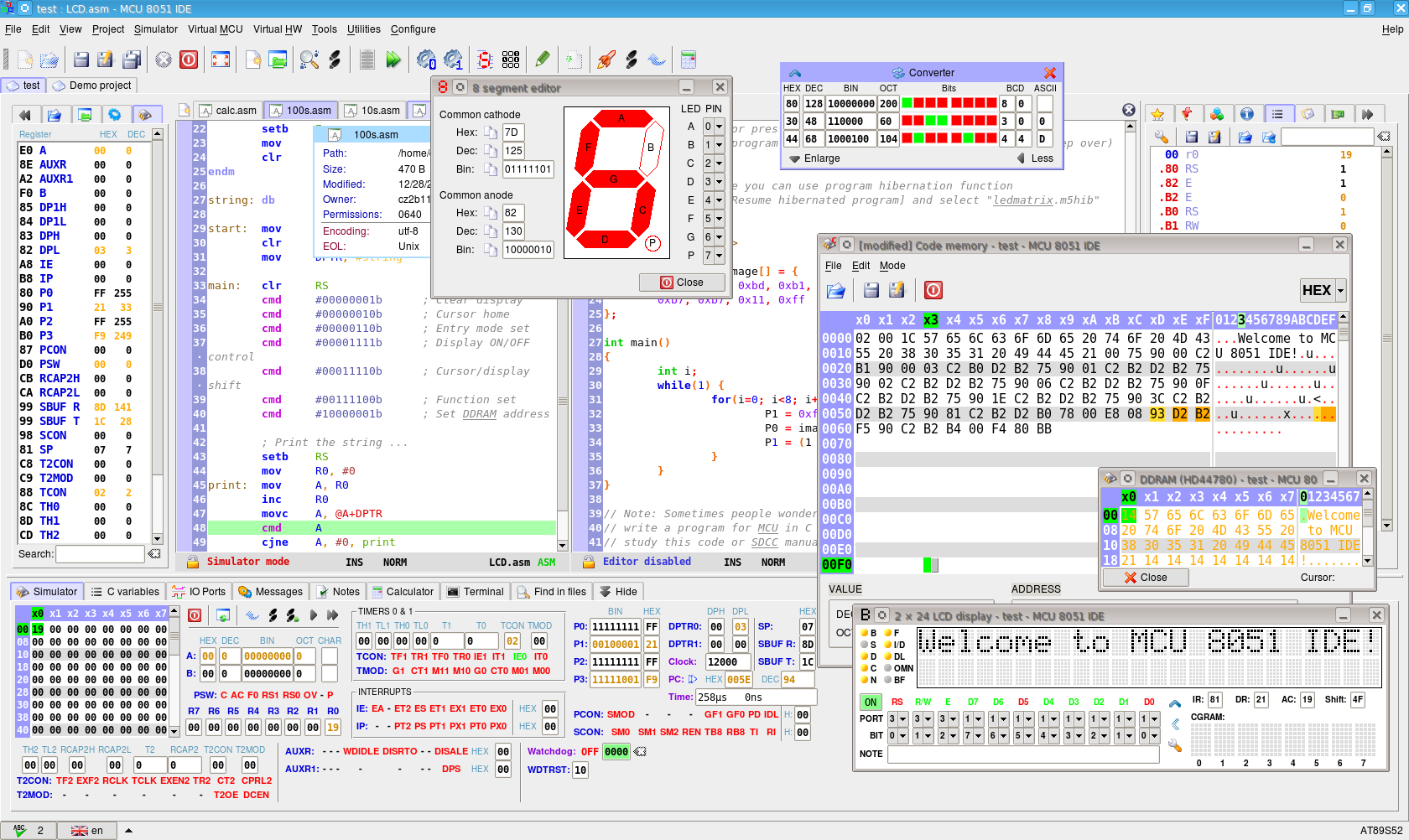
- Developer(s): Martin Ošmera
- Initial release: 2007
- Stable release: 1.4.9 (2014)
- Written in: Tcl/Tk and C++
- Operating system: Unix-like, FreeBSD
- Available in: English, Chinese
- Type: Integrated development environment
- License: GNU General Public License
- Website: sourceforge.net/projects/mcu8051ide/

MCU 8051 IDE is a free software integrated development environment for microcontrollers based on the 8051. MCU 8051 IDE has a built-in simulator not only for the MCU itself, but also LCD displays and simple LED outputs as well as button inputs. It supports two programming languages: C (using SDCC) and assembly and runs on both Windows and Unix-based operating systems, such as FreeBSD and Linux.

== Features ==
- MCU simulator with many debugging features: register status, step by step, interrupt viewer, external memory viewer, code memory viewer, etc.
- Simulator for certain electronic peripherals like LEDs, LED displays, LED matrices, LCD displays, etc.
- Support for C language
- Native macro-assembler
- Support for ASEM-51 and other assemblers
- Advanced text editor with syntax highlighting and validation
- Support for vim and nano embedded in the IDE
- Simple hardware programmer for certain AT89Sxx MCUs
- Scientific calculator: time delay calculation and code generation, base converter, etc.
- Hexadecimal editor

== Supported MCUs ==
The current version 1.4 supports many microcontrollers including:

* 8051
* 80C51
* 8052
* AT89C2051
* AT89C4051
* AT89C51
* AT89C51RC
* AT89C52
* AT89C55WD
* AT89LV51
* AT89LV52
* AT89LV55
* AT89S52
* AT89LS51
* AT89LS52
* AT89S8253
* AT89S2051
* AT89S4051
* T87C5101
* T83C5101
* T83C5102
* TS80C32X2
* TS80C52X2
* TS87C52X2
* AT80C32X2
* AT80C52X2
* AT87C52X2
* AT80C54X2
* AT80C58X2
* AT87C54X2
* AT87C58X2
* TS80C54X2
* TS80C58X2
* TS87C54X2
* TS87C58X2
* TS80C31X2
* AT80C31X2
* 8031
* 8751
* 8032
* 8752
* 80C31
* 87C51
* 80C52
* 87C52
* 80C32
* 80C54
* 87C54
* 80C58
* 87C58

== See also ==
- 8051 information
- Assembly language
- C language
