= Dim3 =

Free and open-source 3D game engine

Dimension 3

- Developer: Klink! Software
- Stable release: v24 / July 2, 2014
- Operating system: Mac OS X; Microsoft Windows; iOS; Linux (requires compilation)
- Type: Game engine
- License: MIT
- Website: Klink! Software

Dim3, also known as Dimension 3, is a free and open-source 3D game engine created by Brian Barnes. It has been chosen as a staff pick for OS X development software by Apple. and featured as one of their "hot game building tools." dim3 has an entry in DevMaster's 3D engines database.

dim3 uses OpenGL for rendering, JavaScript for scripting, XML for data and Simple DirectMedia Layer for resolution switching, input, and sound.

== Components ==
dim3 includes four applications: Engine, Editor, Animator, and Setup.

The Engine is the deployment application that runs games created in dim3. The games (or "projects") are cross-platform and only require the proper engine to run on the proper platform. The engine runs on Mac OS X, Microsoft Windows, iOS, and can be compiled on Linux. All versions can play network games with each other.

The Editor is used to create levels by importing various 3D models into it. The Editor is capable of per-pixel lighting, bump and specular mapping, real-time lighting and/or baked lighting, particles and other special effects, skeletal animation, and customization through javascript.

The Animator is used to add loop animations and effects to models used with dim3. The Animator is used to add bones, setup poses for the bones, and to combine those poses into animations. The Animator uses a skeletal animation system. This makes character movement simplistic yet very realistic.

Setup is a utility that is used to change all other settings in the project, for example, the HUD, network, or particle settings.

A data folder, representing the game, contains all the maps, models, artwork, sounds, and scripts required to create a game in dim3. Each game is self-contained in up to 3 data folders, though only one is actually needed. All non-editor data is in standard formats: PNG, WAV, and mp3. A demonstration "game" is added to dim3, though it is not really a game in itself but shows most of the engine's capabilities.
