= Feh (image viewer) =

Image viewer for Linux and BSD operating systems

feh
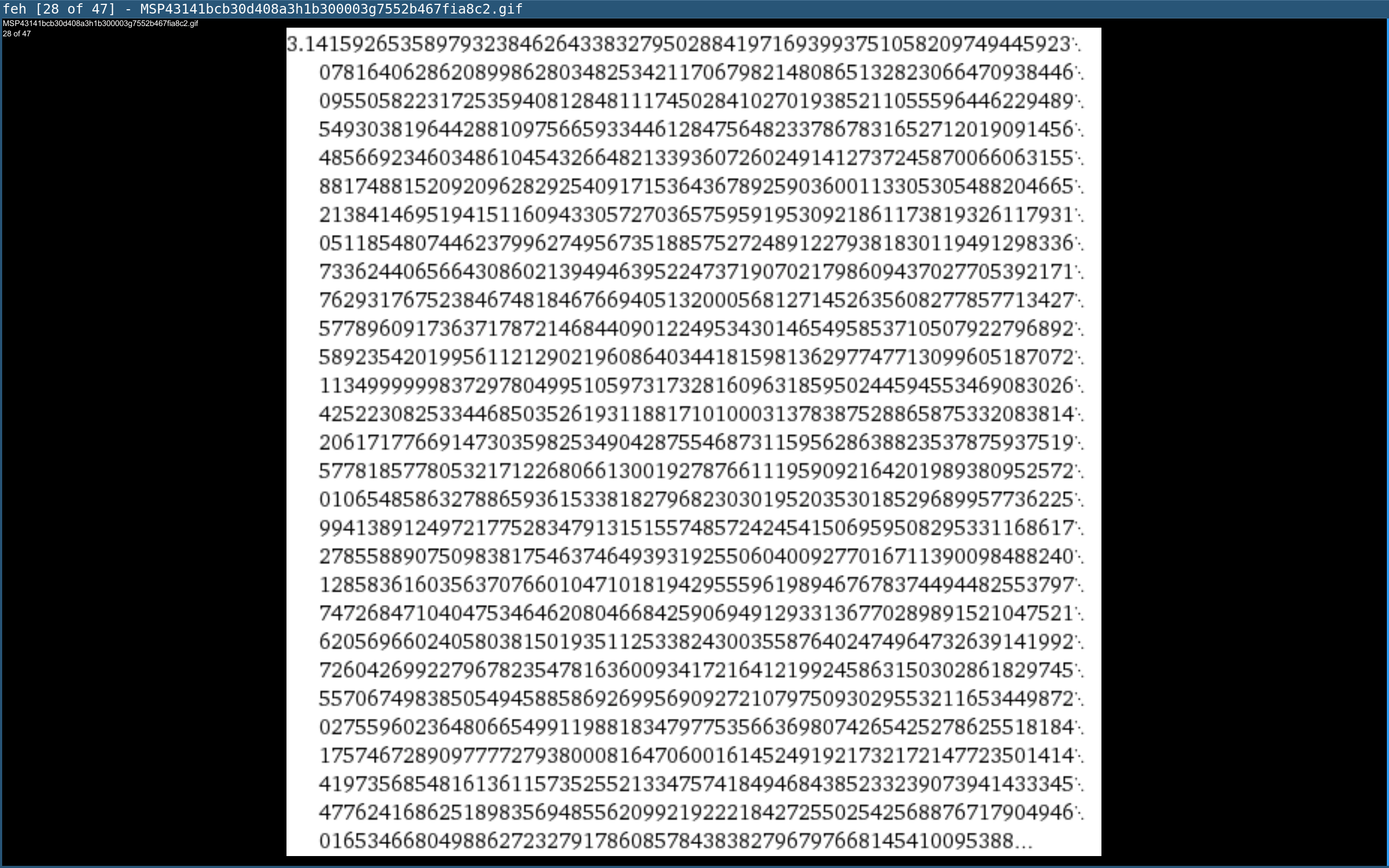
- Screenshot of feh displaying an image with an approximation of pi.
- Developer(s): Tom Gilbert, Birte Kristina Friesel and others
- Stable release: 3.10.3 / 30 June 2024; 8 months ago
- Repository: git.finalrewind.org/feh
- Written in: C
- Operating system: Linux, FreeBSD, OpenBSD
- Available in: English
- Type: Image viewer
- License: MIT-feh
- Website: feh.finalrewind.org

feh is a lightweight image viewer aimed mainly at users of command line interfaces. Unlike most graphical image viewers, feh does not have any graphical control elements (apart from an optional file name display) which enables it to also be used to display background images on systems running the X window system. feh offers six different operational modes which can be controlled via command-line flags; apart from the default slideshow there is thumbnail, index, montage, list, and multiwindow.

== See also ==
- Comparison of image viewers
