= Revive Adserver =

Open source advertising server

- Stable release: 5.5.2 / April 17, 2024; 2 years ago
- Written in: PHP
- Type: Advertising server
- License: GNU General Public License and proprietary
- Website: www.revive-adserver.com
- Repository: github.com/revive-adserver/revive-adserver

Revive Adserver is an open-source advertising server that is licensed under the GNU General Public License. It features an integrated banner management interface and tracking system for gathering statistics. It used to be known under different names in the past, most recently as OpenX Source. In Sep 2013, OpenX Source was sold to Andrew Hill and rebranded Revive Adserver. The current code base for OpenX Enterprise and Revive Adserver (formerly known as OpenX Source) are completely separate.

The software enables web site administrators to rotate banners from both in-house advertisement campaigns as well as from paid or third-party sources, such as Google's AdSense. Revive Adserver provides standard banner rotation, click tracking, zone-based ad selection, zone-based campaign targeting, direct ad selection, ad targeting (per browser, domain, language, etc.), ad capping and support for Adobe Flash banners.

== History ==
OpenX Source began as phpAdsNew, a fork from a similar project called phpAds, created by Tobias Ratschiller in 1998. When the phpAds project came to a halt in 2000, Wim Godden decided to create phpAdsNew by expanding the project with new features. He hoped the 'New' moniker would be temporary, lasting only until Ratschiller could update the phpAds website. Unfortunately, this only happened years later, after the name phpAdsNew was too well established to be changed.

During the time period between 2001 and 2002, Wim Godden led the phpAdsNew project and later received help from developers such as Niels Leenheer and Phil Hord, continually adding new features and improving the existing ones. After the release of version 1.9, a completely revised version 2.0 was created. This task was led by Niels Leenheer. The new version included many new features as well as a revised graphical user interface.

After gaining in popularity and earning support from the open-source community, the project was renamed to OpenAds. Features that were built for phpAdsNew 2.0 were also integrated into the latest OpenAds software, which at this point had reached version 2.3.

When version 2.4.4 was released in 2007, OpenAds was once again rebranded under a new name: OpenX. The final 2.4 version is v2.4.11 and was released in March 2009.

In 2011, the OpenX company disabled direct downloads of the software (a form must be filled out). Wim Godden subsequently made all GPL versions from phpAds 1.2.0 to OpenX 2.8.11 available.

In 2020 and 2021, compromised Revive ad servers were used to deliver malvertising (advertisements which led victims to install malware). Researchers estimated number of victims to be in "the tens if not hundreds of million of devices".
