= Free Software Directory =

The Free Software Directory (FSD) is a project of the Free Software Foundation (FSF). It catalogs free software that runs under free operating systems—particularly GNU and Linux. The cataloged projects are often able to run in several other operating systems. The project was formerly co-run by UNESCO.

Unlike some other directories that focus on free software, Free Software Directory staff verify the licenses of software listed in the directory.

== Coverage growth and usages ==
FSD has been used as a source for assessing the share of free software, for example finding in September 2002 an amount of "1550 entries, of which 1363 (87.9%) used the GPL license, 103 (6.6%) used the LGPL license, 32 (2.0%) used a BSD or BSD-like license, 29 (1.9%) used the Artistic license, 5 (0.3%) used the MIT license". By September 2009, the Directory listed 6,000 packages whose number grew up to 6,500 in October 2011, when the newly updated directory was launched. All listed packages are "free for any computer user to download, run and share. Each entry is individually checked and tested ... so users know that any program they come across in the directory will be truly free software ... with free documentation and without proprietary software requirements".

Several scientific publications review or refer to the directory. It has been remarked that the Directory "only includes software that runs on free operating systems. The FSF/UNESCO Free Software Directory is also a collaborative project, offering a web interface for users to enter and update entries". Among the critical issues of the previous version, it has been pointed out that while "available software is described using a variety of textual metadata, including the components upon which a particular piece of software depends", "unfortunately, those dependencies are only listed by name, and locating and retrieving them is left to the user". On the other hand, the accuracy of the directory review on licenses is acknowledged. The code review from the directory's editorial board is suitable for obtaining statistics on subsets of free software packages reliably clustered by license.

In September 2011, the Free Software Directory was re-implemented as a wiki, using MediaWiki and the Semantic MediaWiki extension, to allow users to directly add to and modify its contents. Semantic MediaWiki provides the directory with semantic web technologies by adding "advanced search and presentation capabilities, structured to be useful for reading by both humans and data-mining programs".

The new edition of the directory has been described as designed to ease and support with semantics the discovery and harvesting of information on free software programs. "An extensive and flexible category system, plus over 40,000 keywords and more than 40 different fields of information, enhance both simple and advanced searching".

A recent snapshot of the taxonomy of the projects reviewed and accepted in the directory is the following:

- accessibility
- accounting
- addressbooks
- addresses
- archive
- audio
- barcodes
- barcoding
- bitcoin
- cad
- calculating
- calendar
- command-line
- compressing
- console
- copying
- daemon
- database
- desktop-enhancement
- e-mail
- ebooks
- ecommerce
- editing
- education
- email
- fax
- faxing
- file-manager
- frontend
- gameplaying
- gnome-app
- graphics
- hobbies
- html
- images
- interface
- internet-application
- kde-app
- library
- live-communications
- localization
- mathematics
- mixing
- organizing
- pim
- playing
- printing
- productivity
- project-management
- reading
- science
- security
- software-development
- specialized
- spreadsheet
- sql
- stock-market
- storage
- system-administration
- telephony
- text
- text-creation
- timekeeping
- timetracker
- video
- web
- web-authoring
- window-manager
- x-window-system
- xml
