= Magick Image File Format =

Lossless image file format

The Magick Image File Format, abbreviated MIFF, is an image format used by ImageMagick. It may be used to store bitmap images platform-independently.

A MIFF file consists of two sections. The headers consist of ISO-8859-1 encoded bytes, each with pairs consisting of key=value. Keys include background-color, depth, compression rows, units, and custom key/value pairs. The latter may include data such as copyright and comments. The list is terminated with a NULL character.

The next section contains the binary image data. The exact format is defined by the class header. Usually it is RGBA or CMYK.
