= Energy planning =

Energy planning has a number of different meanings, but the most common meaning of the term is the process of developing long-range policies to help guide the future of a local, national, regional or even the global energy system. Energy planning is often conducted within governmental organizations but may also be carried out by large energy companies such as electric utilities or oil and gas producers. These oil and gas producers release greenhouse gas emissions. Energy planning may be carried out with input from different stakeholders drawn from government agencies, local utilities, academia and other interest groups.

Since 1973, energy modeling, on which energy planning is based, has developed significantly. Energy models can be classified into three groups: descriptive, normative, and futuristic forecasting.

Energy planning is often conducted using integrated approaches that consider both the provision of energy supplies and the role of energy efficiency in reducing demands (Integrated Resource Planning). Energy planning should always reflect the outcomes of population growth and economic development. There are also several alternative energy solutions which avoid the release of greenhouse gasses, like electrifying current machines and using nuclear energy. An unused energy plan for cities is created as a result of a careful investigation of the arranging prepare, which coordinating city arranging and vitality arranging together and gives energy arrangements for high-level cities and mechanical parks.

== Planning and market concepts ==
Energy planning has traditionally played a strong role in setting the framework for regulations in the energy sector (for example, influencing what type of power plants might be built or what prices were charged for fuels). But in the past two decades many countries have deregulated their energy systems so that the role of energy planning has been reduced, and decisions have increasingly been left to the market. This has arguably led to increased competition in the energy sector, although there is little evidence that this has translated into lower energy prices for consumers. Indeed, in some cases, deregulation has led to significant concentrations of "market power" with large very profitable companies having a large influence as price setters.

== Integrated resource planning ==
Approaches to energy planning depends on the planning agent and the scope of the exercise. Several catch-phrases are associated with energy planning. Basic to all is resource planning, i.e. a view of the possible sources of energy in the future. A forking in methods is whether the planner considers the possibility of influencing the consumption (demand) for energy. The 1970s energy crisis ended a period of relatively stable energy prices and stable supply-demand relation. Concepts of demand side management, least cost planning and integrated resource planning (IRP) emerged with new emphasis on the need to reduce energy demand by new technologies or simple energy saving.

== Sustainable energy planning ==
Further global integration of energy supply systems and local and global environmental limits amplifies the scope of planning both in subject and time perspective. Sustainable energy planning should consider environmental impacts of energy consumption and production, particularly in light of the threat of global climate change, which is caused largely by emissions of greenhouse gases from the world's energy systems, which is a long-term process.

The 2022 renewable energy industry outlook shows supportive policies from an administration focused on combatting climate change in 2022's political landscape aid an expected growth of the renewable energy industry Biden has argued in favor of developing the clean energy industry in the US and in the world to vigorously address climate change. President Biden expressed his intention to move away from the oil industry. 2022 administration calls for, "Plan for Climate Change and Environmental Justice", which aims to reach 100% carbon-free power generation by 2035 and net-zero emissions by 2050 in the USA.

Many OECD countries and some U.S. states are now moving to more closely regulate their energy systems. For example, many countries and states have been adopting targets for emissions of CO_{2} and other greenhouse gases. In light of these developments, broad scope integrated energy planning could become increasingly important

Sustainable Energy Planning takes a more holistic approach to the problem of planning for future energy needs. It is based on a structured decision-making process based on six key steps, namely:

1. Exploration of the context of the current and future situation
2. Formulation of particular problems and opportunities which need to be addressed as part of the Sustainable Energy Planning process. This could include such issues as "peak oil" or "economic recession/depression", as well as the development of energy demand technologies.
3. Create a range of models to predict the likely impact of different scenarios. This traditionally would consist of mathematical modelling but is evolving to include "Soft System Methodologies" such as focus groups, peer ethnographic research, "what if" logical scenarios etc.
4. Based on the output from a wide range of modelling exercises and literature reviews, open forum discussion etc., the results are analysed and structured in an easily interpreted format.
5. The results are then interpreted to determine the scope, scale and likely implementation methodologies which would be required to ensure successful implementation.
6. This stage is a quality assurance process which actively interrogates each stage of the Sustainable Energy Planning process and checks if it has been carried out rigorously, without any bias and that it furthers the aims of sustainable development and does not act against them.
7. The last stage of the process is to take action. This may consist of the development, publication and implementation of a range of policies, regulations, procedures or tasks which together will help to achieve the goals of the Sustainable Energy Plan.

Designing for implementation is often carried out using "Logical Framework Analysis" which interrogates a proposed project and checks that it is completely logical, that it has no fatal errors and that appropriate contingency arrangements have been put in place to ensure that the complete project will not fail if a particular strand of the project fails.

Sustainable energy planning is particularly appropriate for communities who want to develop their own energy security, while employing best available practice in their planning processes.

== Energy planning tools (software) ==
Energy planning can be conducted on different software platforms and over various timespans and with different qualities of resolution (i.e. very short divisions of time/space or very large divisions). There are multiple platforms available for all sorts of energy planning analysis, with focuses on different areas, and significant growth in terms of modeling software or platforms available in recent years. Energy planning tools can be identified as commercial, open source, educational, free, and as used by governments (often custom tools).

== Potential energy solutions ==
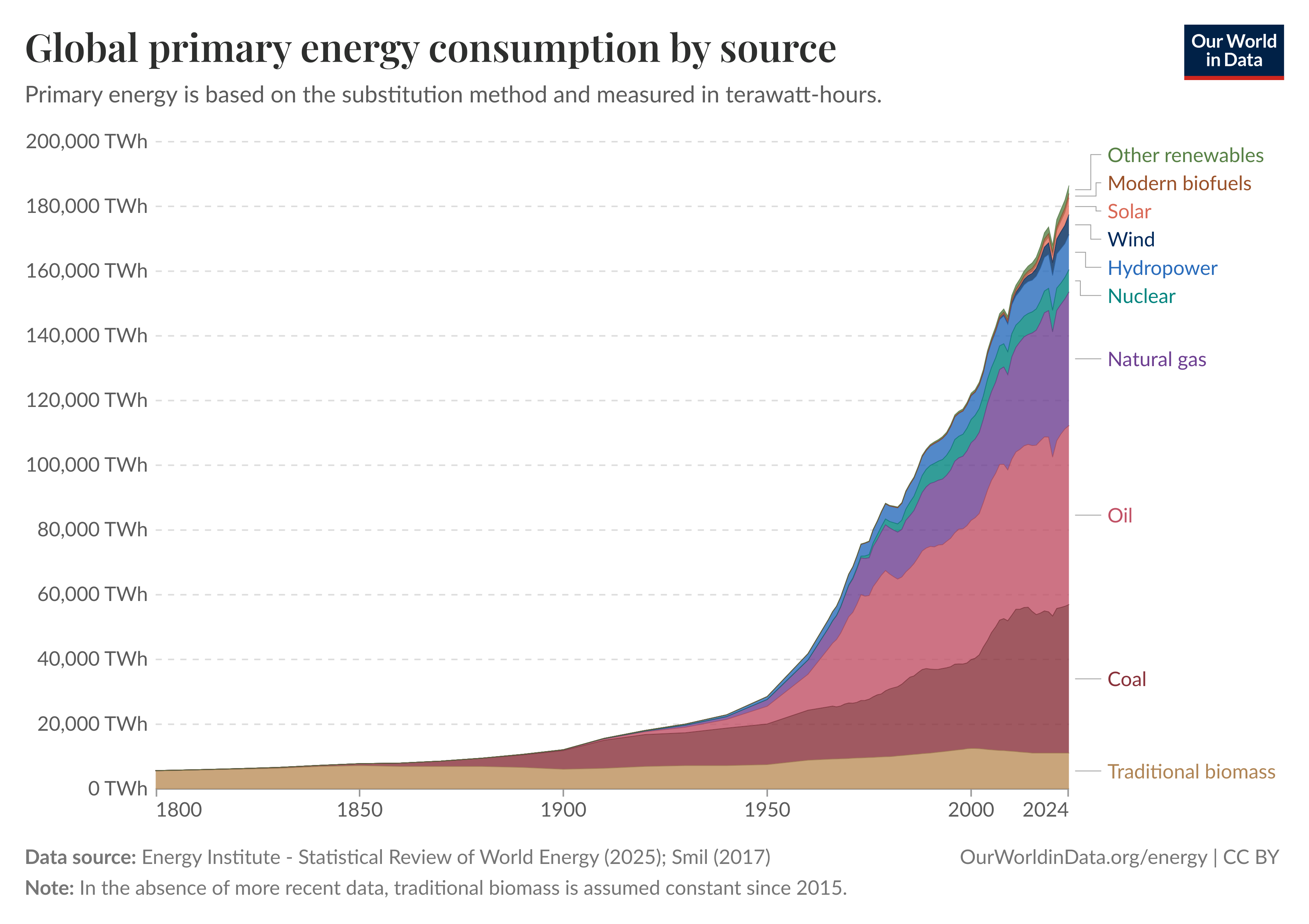
The chart represents global energy consumption and shows the breakdown from each energy source.

=== Electrification ===
One potential energy option is the move to electrify all machines that currently use fossil fuels for their energy source. There are already electric alternatives available such as electric cars, electric cooktops, and electric heat pumps, now these products need to be widely implemented to electrify and decarbonize our energy use. To reduce our dependence on fossil fuels and transfer to electric machines, it requires that all electricity be generated by renewable sources. As of 2020 60.3% of all energy generated in the United States came from fossil fuels, 19.7% came from nuclear energy, and 19.8% came from renewables. The United States is still heavily relying on fossil fuels as a source of energy. For the electrification of our machines to help the efforts to decarbonize, more renewable energy sources, such as wind and solar would have to be built.

Another potential problem that comes with the use of renewable energy is the energy transmission. A study conducted by Princeton University found that the locations with the highest renewable potential are in the Midwest, however, the places with the highest energy demand are coastal cities. To effectively make use of the electricity coming from these renewable sources, the U.S. electric grid would have to be nationalized, and more high voltage transmission lines would have to be built. The total amount of electricity that the grid would have to be able to accommodate has to increase. If more electric cars were being driven there would be a decline in gasoline demand and an increased demand for electricity, this increased demand for electricity would require our electric grids to be able to transport more energy at any given moment than is currently viable.

=== Nuclear Energy ===
Nuclear energy is sometimes considered to be a clean energy source. Nuclear energy's only associated carbon emission takes place during the process of mining for uranium, but the process of obtaining energy from uranium does not emit any carbon. A primary concern in using nuclear energy stems from the issue of what to do with radioactive waste. The highest level source of radioactive waste comes from the spent reactor fuel, the radioactive fuel decreases over time through radioactive decay. The time it takes for the radioactive waste to decay depends on the length of the substance's half-life. Currently, the United States does not have a permanent disposal facility for high-level nuclear waste.

Public support behind increasing nuclear energy production is an important consideration when planning for sustainable energy. Nuclear energy production has a complicated past. Multiple nuclear power plants having accidents or meltdowns has tainted the reputation of nuclear energy for many. A considerable section of the public is concerned about the health and environmental impacts of a nuclear power plant melting down, believing that the risk is not worth the reward. Though there is a portion of the population that believes expanding nuclear energy is necessary and that the threats of climate change far outweigh the possibility of a meltdown, especially considering the advancements in technology that have been made within recent decades.

== Global greenhouse gas emissions and energy production ==
The majority of global manmade greenhouse gas emissions is derived from the energy sector, contributing to 72.0% of global emissions. The majority of that energy goes toward producing electricity and heat (31.0%), the next largest contributor is agriculture (11%), followed by transportation (15%), forestry (6%) and manufacturing (12%). There are multiple different molecular compounds that fall under the classification of green house gases including, carbon dioxide, methane, and nitrous oxide. Carbon dioxide is the largest emitted greenhouse gas, making up 76% of global emission. Methane is the second largest emitted greenhouse gas at 16%, methane is primarily emitted from the agriculture industry. Lastly nitrous oxide makes up 6% of global emitted greenhouse gases, agriculture and industry are the largest emitters of nitrous oxide.

The challenges in the energy sector include the reliance on coal. Coal production remains key to the energy mix and global imports rely on coal to meet the growing demand for gas Energy planning evaluates the current energy situation and estimates future changes based on industrialization patterns and resource availability. Many of the future changes and solutions depend on the global effort to move away from coal and begin making energy efficient technology and continue to electrify the world.

== See also ==
- Capacity factor – Electrical production measure
- Wind power forecasting – Estimate of the expected production of one or more wind turbines
  - Wind energy software – Type of specialized software
- Variable renewable energy#Intermittent energy source – Class of renewable energy sources
- Wind resource assessment – Estimation of the production of a wind farm
- Virtual power plant – System to aggregate and deliver power from distributed power sources
- Electricity#Generation and transmission – Phenomena related to electric charge
- Transmission system operator – Energy transporter
- Base load – Minimum level of demand on an electrical grid over a span of time
- Merit order – Ranking of available sources of energy
- Load factor (electrical) – Average power divided by peak power
- Load following power plant – Power plant that adjusts output based on demand
- Peak demand – Highest power demand on a grid in a specified period
