= Wind energy software =

Type of specialized software

Specialized wind energy software applications aid in the development and operation of wind farms.

== Pre-feasibility and feasibility analysis ==
The RETScreen software wind power model is designed to evaluate energy production and savings, costs, emission reductions, financial viability and risk for central-grid, isolated-grid and off-grid wind energy projects, for multi-turbine and single-turbine hybrid systems. Developed by the Government of Canada, the software is multilingual, and includes links to wind energy resource maps.

The Wind Data Generator (WDG) is a Wind Energy Software tool capable of running WRF (Weather Research and Forecasting) model to create a wind atlas and to generate wind data at resolutions of 3 km to 10 km.

== Turbine design ==
Software helps design wind turbines. There are several aero-elastic packages that are used in this design process.

FOCUS6 aids in the design of wind turbines and turbine components such as rotor blades. It was developed by Knowledge Centre Wind turbine Materials and Constructions (WMC) and Energy Research Centre of the Netherlands (ECN).

The National Wind Technology Center (NWTC), a division of the U.S. National Renewable Energy Laboratory (NREL), has developed many packages which are used by turbine manufacturers and researchers. NWTC has developed a suite of turbine design and performance prediction codes which rely on Blade Element Momentum (BEM) theory. WTPerf uses steady BEM theory to model turbine performance. FAST is a comprehensive aero-elastic simulator which uses unsteady BEM theory to model a turbine as a collection of rigid and flexible bodies in a spatiotemporal field of turbulent flow. Germanischer Lloyd found FAST suitable for "the calculation of onshore wind turbine loads for design and certification." OpenFAST is an open-source wind turbine simulation tool that was established with the FAST v8 code as its starting point in 2018.

The open source software QBlade developed by the wind energy research group of Hermann Föttinger Institute of TU Berlin (Chair of Fluid Dynamics) is a BEM code coupled with the airfoil simulation code XFOIL. It allows the user to develop/import airfoil shapes, simulate them and use them for the design and simulation of wind turbine blades/rotors with the use of steady state BEM theory. The software is built with the Qt framework thus it includes a graphical user interface.

The open source software Vortexje, developed by Baayen & Heinz GmbH in Berlin, is an unsteady 3D panel method implementation suitable for dynamic simulation of vertical and horizontal axis wind turbines. Easily coupled with other simulation environments such as Simulink and Dymola, it is suitable for aerodynamic optimization, fluid-structure interaction problems, and unsteady control system simulation.

Ashes is a software package for analyzing aerodynamic and mechanical forces for onshore and offshore horizontal axis wind turbines. It is based on research done at the Norwegian University of Science and Technology in Trondheim, Norway.

Turbine design engineering software
Software	Publisher	Latest stable version	License	Certified
ADCoS	ADC	unk.	proprietary	No
Alaska Wind	ICM e.V.	2024.2.0	proprietary	?
Ashes	SIMIS as	3.18	proprietary	No
BHawC	SGRE	unk.	trade secret	unk.
Bladed	DNV	4.13	proprietary	Yes
OpenFAST	NREL	4.0.3	open source	Yes
Flex	DTU Lyngby	5	proprietary	Yes
FOCUS6	WMC	6	proprietary	No
HAWC2	DTU Wind Energy	12.2	proprietary	No
QBlade	TU Berlin	2.0.8	open source	No
Simpack	Simpack	2017.2	proprietary	No
Vortexje	Baayen & Heinz GmbH	-	open source	No

== Flow modeling ==
Wind flow modeling software predicts important wind characteristics at locations where measurements are not available. Furow is a software which offers a lineal flow model and a Computational fluid dynamic model in the same software. WAsP was created at Denmark's Risø National Laboratory. WAsP uses a potential flow model to predict how wind flows over terrain at a site. Meteodyn WT, Windie, WindSim, WindStation and the open-source code ZephyTOOLS use computational fluid dynamics instead, which are potentially more accurate, but more computationally intensive.

Flow modelling software
Software	Publisher	Latest stable version	License	Certified
Continuum	Cancalia/One Energy	2.2.5	proprietary	-
Furow	Etulos Solute	2.0	proprietary	Yes
WAsP	DTU Wind Energy	12	proprietary	Yes
WindSim	Vector AS	8.0	proprietary	Yes
Meteodyn WT	Meteodyn	1.10	proprietary	Yes
ZephyCFD	Zephy-Science	19.12	GPL3	Yes
WindStation	menzio GmbH	1.3.21	proprietary	-
Windie	Windie Lda.	-	proprietary	-
SimWorks	IdealSimulations	20.12	free software	-

== Farm modeling ==
This software simulates wind farm behavior, most importantly to calculate its energy output. The user can usually input wind data, height and roughness contour lines (topography), turbine specifications, background maps, and define environmental restrictions. Processing this information produces the design of a wind farm that maximizes energy production while accounting for restrictions and construction issues. Packages include Furow, Meteodyn WT, openWind, WindFarm, WindFarmer: Analyst, WindPRO, WindSim and WindStation. WakeBlaster is a specialised CFD service for modelling the wind farm wake losses.

== Farm visualization ==
Wind farm visualization software graphically presents a proposed wind farm, most importantly for the purpose of obtaining building permits. The primary techniques include photomontages, zone-of-visual-impact maps and three-dimensional visualization (perspective views of the landscape often incorporating aerial photography and including turbines and other objects).

Farm visualization software
Software	Publisher	Latest stable version	License	Certified
Furow	Etulos Solute	2.0	proprietary	Yes
Openwind	UL Solutions		proprietary	Yes
windPRO	EMD International A/S	4.3	proprietary	
Meteodyn WT	Meteodyn	1.10	proprietary	Yes
ZephyCFD	Zephy-Science	19.12	GPL3	Yes
Windplanner	The Imagineers	v3	proprietary	
WindFarmer: Analyst	DNV GL	1.0	proprietary	

== Farm monitoring ==
Wind farm monitoring software is a software that allows people to see if the wind turbines are running well or are going to become broken. Other functions of monitoring software is reporting, analysis of measurement data (power curve) and tools for monitoring of environmental constraints (bat control, etc.).

Farm monitoring software
Software	Publisher	Latest stable version	License	Certified
Clir	Clir		proprietary	
Meteodyn WPA	Meteodyn	1.9.1	proprietary	Yes
GPM Horizon	GreenPowerMonitor		proprietary	
Greenbyte Energy Cloud	Greenbyte AB		proprietary	
ROTORsoft	DrehPunkt GmbH		proprietary	
windPRO - PERFORMANCE CHECK module	EMD International A/S	4.3	proprietary	
WindDeep Monitoring	WindDeep		proprietary	
windPRO - TR10 module	EMD International A/S	4.3	proprietary	Yes
windOPS	EMD International A/S	2	proprietary	

== Prediction software ==
For existing wind farms, several software systems exist which produce short and medium term forecasts for the generated power (single farms or complete forecast regions) using existing numerical weather prediction data (NWP) and live (SCADA) farm data as input. Examples of numerical weather prediction models used for this purpose are the European HiRLAM (High Resolution Limited Area Model) and the GFS (Global Forecast System) from NOAA. Open-source systems like Anemos, developed through European research initiatives, provide advanced forecasting capabilities for wind power integration into energy grids, while proprietary tools such as WindCast© by WindDeep employ machine learning to enhance prediction accuracy and optimize operational efficiency.

== See also ==
- Power engineering software
