= Global Wind Atlas =

Software tool to help identify locations for wind power generation

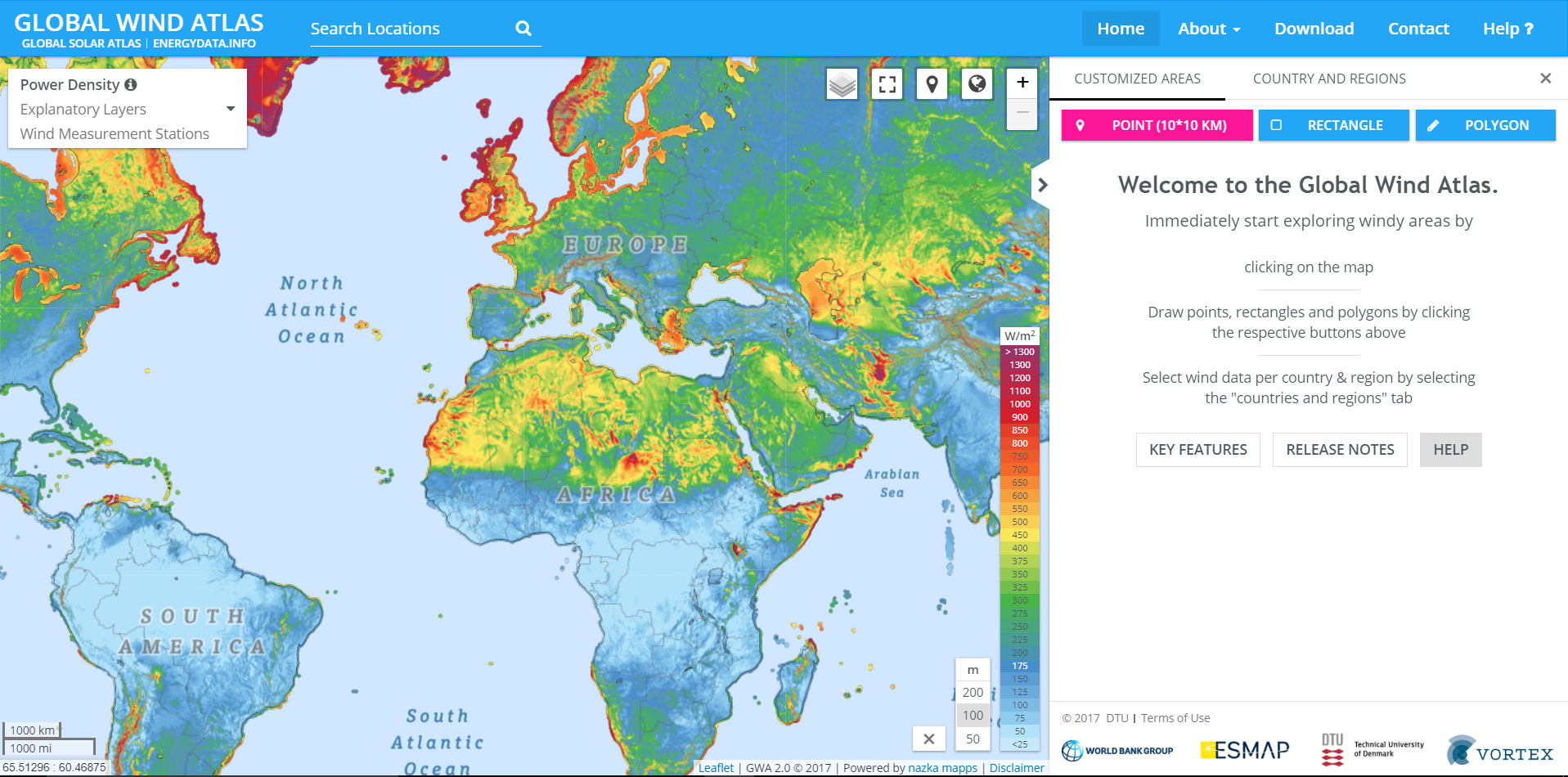
Screenshot of the Global Wind Atlas website (version 2.2)

The Global Wind Atlas is a web-based application developed to help policymakers and investors identify potential high-wind areas for wind power generation virtually anywhere in the world, and perform preliminary calculations. It provides free access to data on wind power density and wind speed at multiple heights using the latest historical weather data and modeling, at an output resolution of 250 meters. It is owned and maintained by the Wind Energy Department of the Technical University of Denmark (DTU Wind Energy) and in recent years has been developed in close partnership with the World Bank, with funding provided by the Energy Sector Management Assistance Program (ESMAP).

== History ==
The original version of the Global Wind Atlas (GWA 1.0) was developed by DTU Wind Energy under the framework of the Clean Energy Ministerial (CEM) and, in particular, the CEM Working Group on Solar and Wind Technologies, led by Germany, Spain and Denmark. The Technology Development and Demonstration Program of the Danish Energy Agency (EUDP 11-II, 64011-0347) funded GWA 1.0 as the Danish contribution to the objectives of the working group. GWA 1.0 was launched in 2015, and benefited from collaboration with the International Renewable Energy Agency (IRENA) and the MASDAR Institute. The IRENA Global Atlas of Renewable Energy created a dedicated platform to serve GWA 1.0 data to a worldwide audience.

In early 2017, DTU Wind Energy entered into discussions with ESMAP at the World Bank to update and improve the Global Wind Atlas, and bring it into line with the Global Solar Atlas that was launched by the World Bank in January 2017. Utilizing funding provided under ESMAP's existing initiative on renewable energy resource assessment and mapping, the company VORTEX FDC was commissioned to carry out a global mesoscale wind energy modeling exercise at 9 km resolution. This data was provided to DTU Wind Energy for further microscale modeling, initially down to 1 km resolution. In November 2018 the Global Wind Atlas (GWA 2.0) was launched by DTU Wind Energy and the World Bank at the Wind Europe 2018 conference in Amsterdam, the Netherlands, based on a completely redesigned user interface developed by the company Nazka Mapps.

Following further modeling work, a new version of the microscale modeling data was released in July 2018 (GWA 2.1), bringing the resolution down to 250 meters. This was followed by a further release in September 2018 (GWA 2.2) that included a number of improvements to the user interface, a new tool for preparing and downloading poster maps, and various bug fixes. The most recent release, in November 2018 (GWA 2.3) introduced three capacity factor layers, new wind roses, and improved calculation of power density, and the ability to download GIS files, among other features.

The latest release of the Global Wind Atlas (3.0) was launched on October 25, 2019, featuring further methodological modeling improvements, all new raw data (based on 10 years of mesoscale time-series model simulations), data coverage spanning 200 kilometers offshore, two additional heights (data now at 10, 50, 100, 150 and 200 m above ground/sea level), as well as the introduction of the all new energy yield calculator, allowing users to a) specify a generic or custom wind turbine and b) create downloadable GIS-data for annual energy production, capacity factor, or full load hours for estimating power generation for any given point or area.

== Methodology ==
The Global Wind Atlas is based on a coupling of mesoscale to microscale modeling. The mesoscale modeling carried out by Vortex for GWA 2.0 uses ERA Interim meteorological re-analysis data provided by the European Centre for Medium-Range Weather Forecasts. Version 3.0 takes advantage of next generation of reanalysis ERA5 while increasing mesoscale resolution to 3km. That data is converted to generalized wind for input to the microscale models developed and run by DTU. While tools such as the Global Wind Atlas can provide useful data to support planning and initial site scoping, they are no replacement for the more detailed analysis needed when evaluating actual wind farm projects.

== Outputs and usage ==
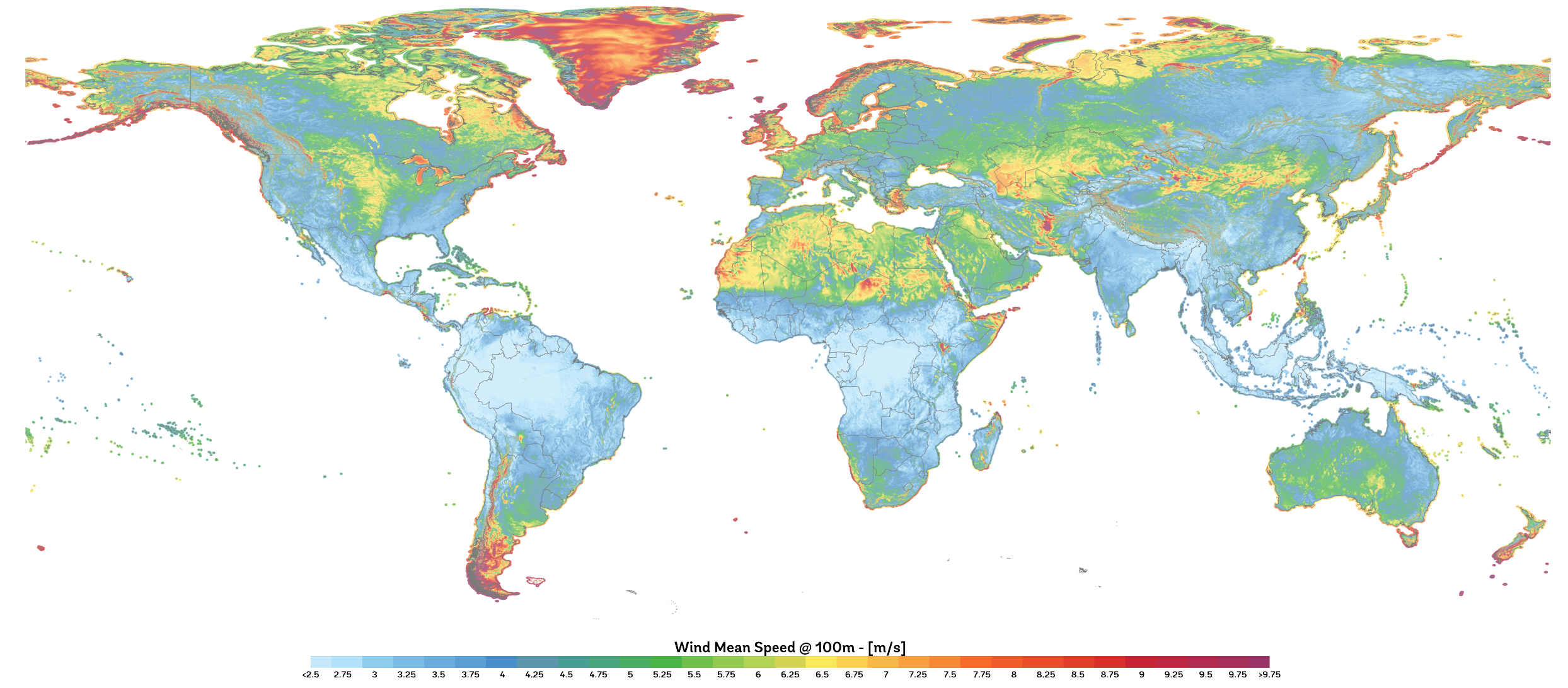
Global map of wind speed at 100 m above surface level.

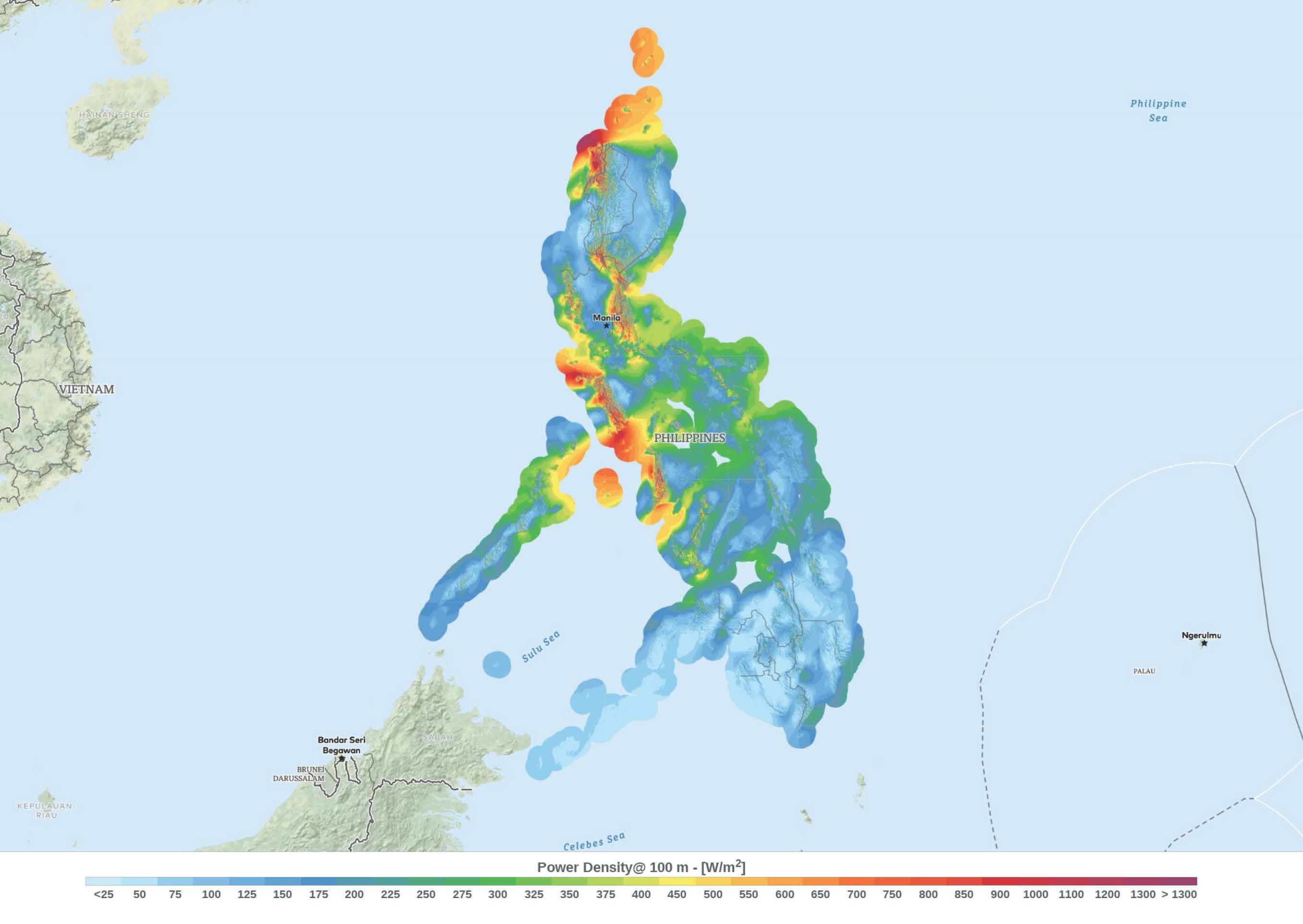
Philippines wind power density map at 100 m above surface level.

In addition to the data available via the Global Wind Atlas website, users may also download poster maps, GIS data, and Generalized Wind Climate (GWC) files for use in commercial wind resource assessment software such as WAsP.

GIS data from the Global Wind Atlas is available via the IRENA Global Atlas for Renewable Energy, and has been included as the core wind data in the RETScreen software. It is used by governments, renewable energy developers, and academics, and has an average of 7,500 unique users per month as of October 2018.

Data from the Global Wind Atlas has been used by the World Bank Group to create maps on offshore wind technical potential in a number of developing countries as part of a report on this topic published in 2019. The methodology used the 200 km of offshore wind data coverage, added a 1 km buffer zone, and then mapped any areas up to 1 km in depth with wind speeds above 7 m/s. The analysis divides the resource potential into fixed foundation and floating potential, with a cut-off of 50 m water depth for fixed. 55 regional and country maps have since been published and the analysis has been cited in a number of other publications.

== See also ==
- Wind resource assessment
- Wind power
