= Global Solar Atlas =

Database on global solar-power potential

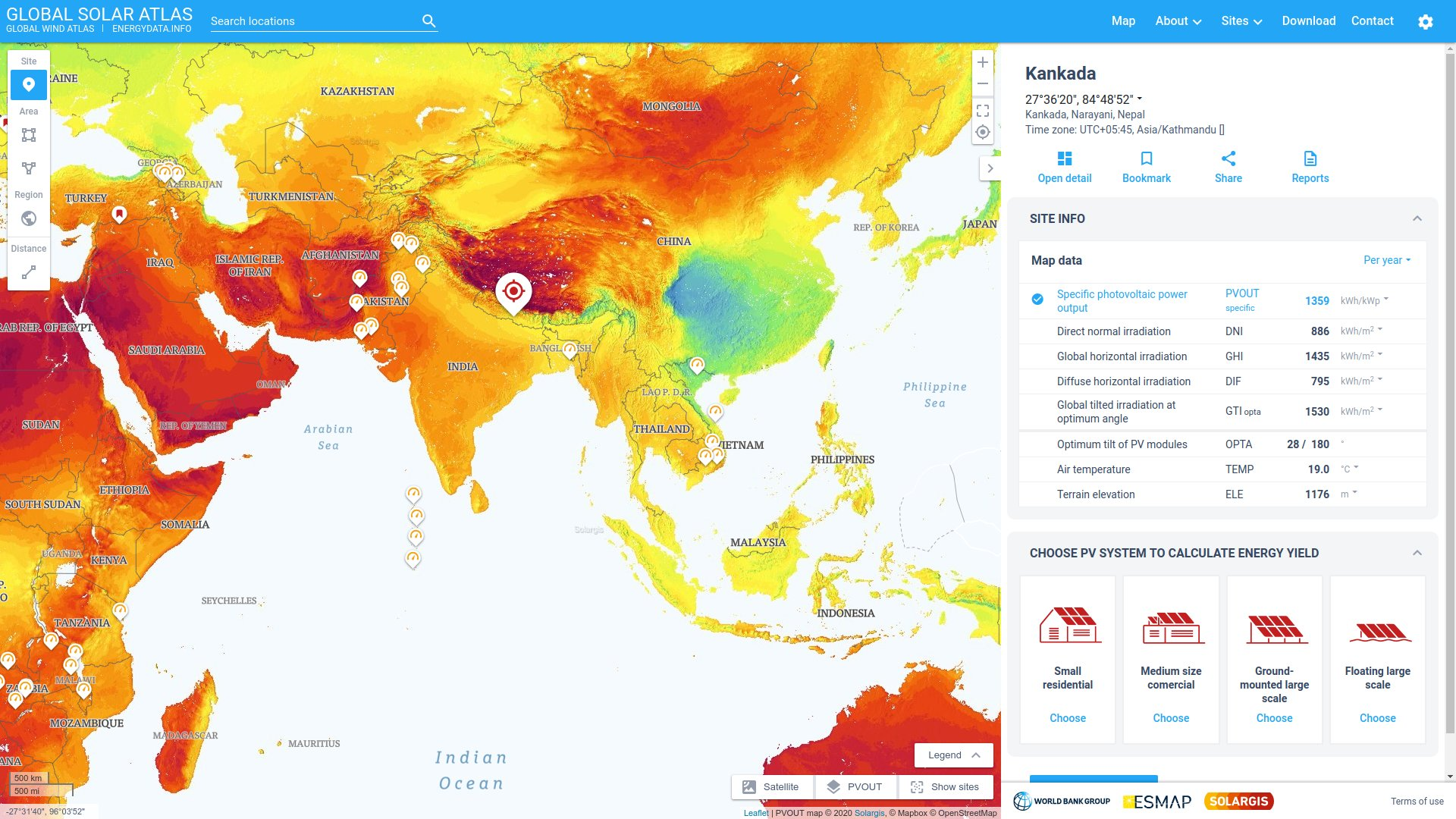
Global Solar Atlas (GSA v2.2): screenshot of the interactive map interface (status Jun 2020).

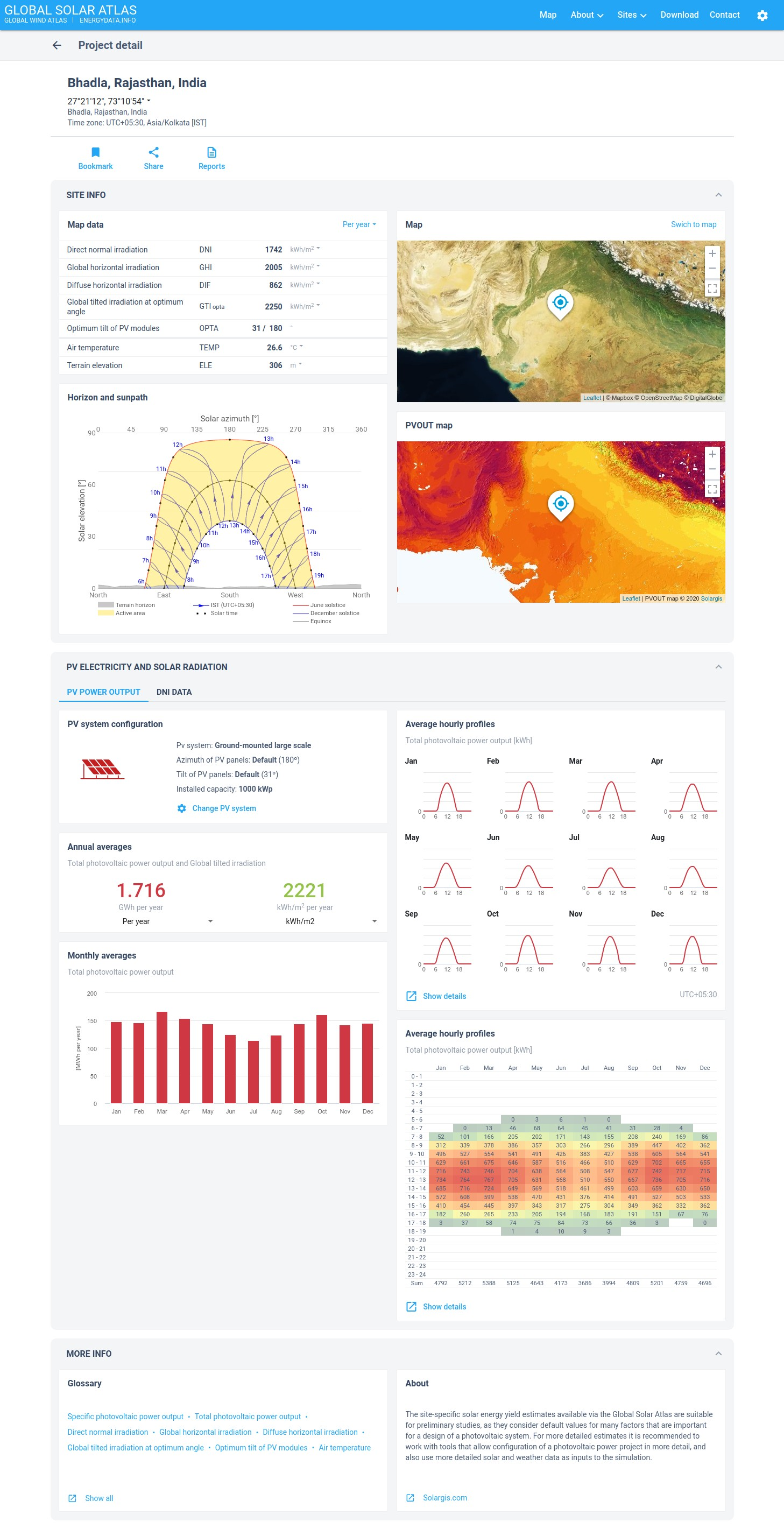
Site detail view (in this case for the location Bhadla, Rajasthan, India) summarises the data important for preliminary site assessment of a photovoltaic power plant

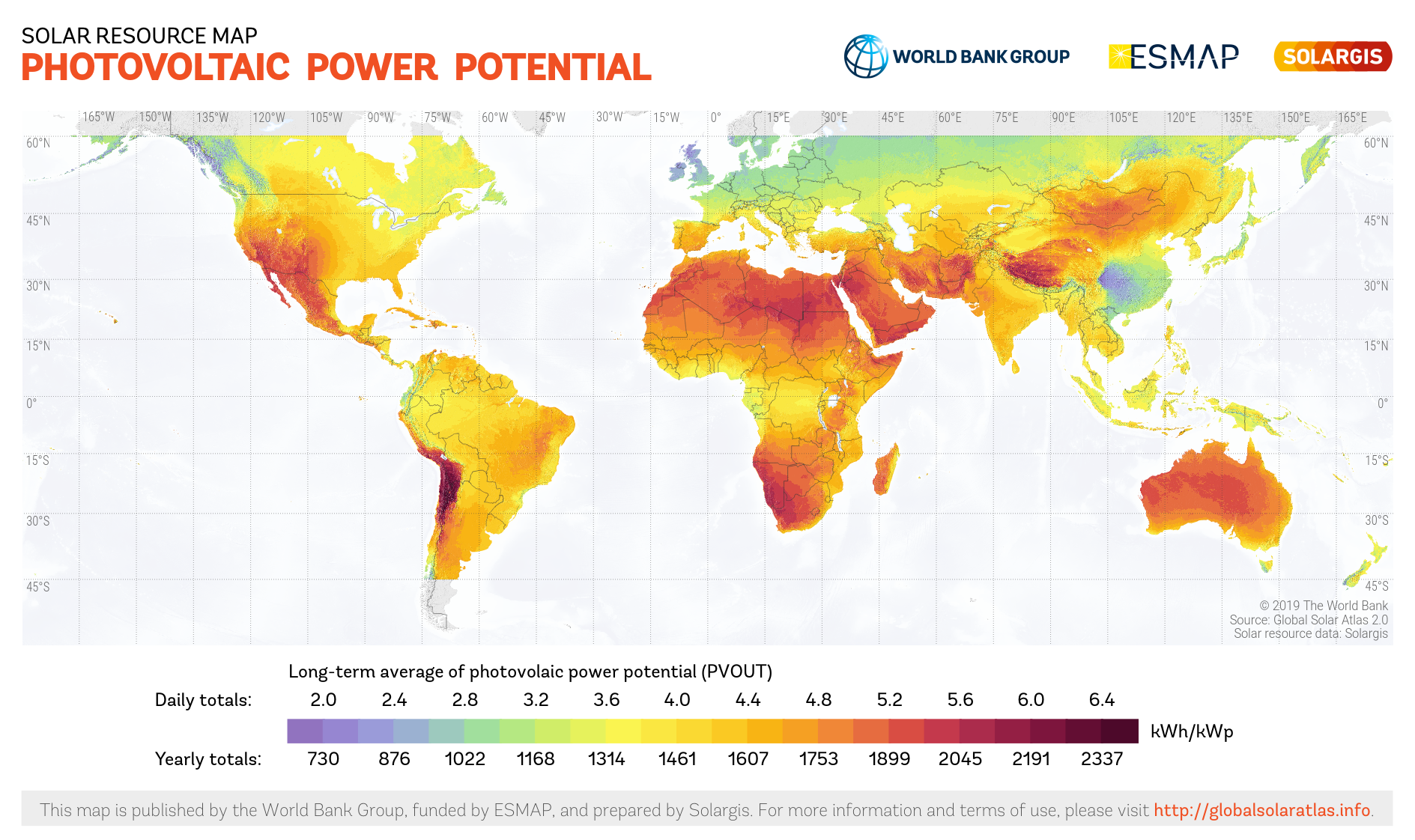
Global map of Photovoltaic Power Potential downloadable via the Global Solar Atlas (GSA 2.2)

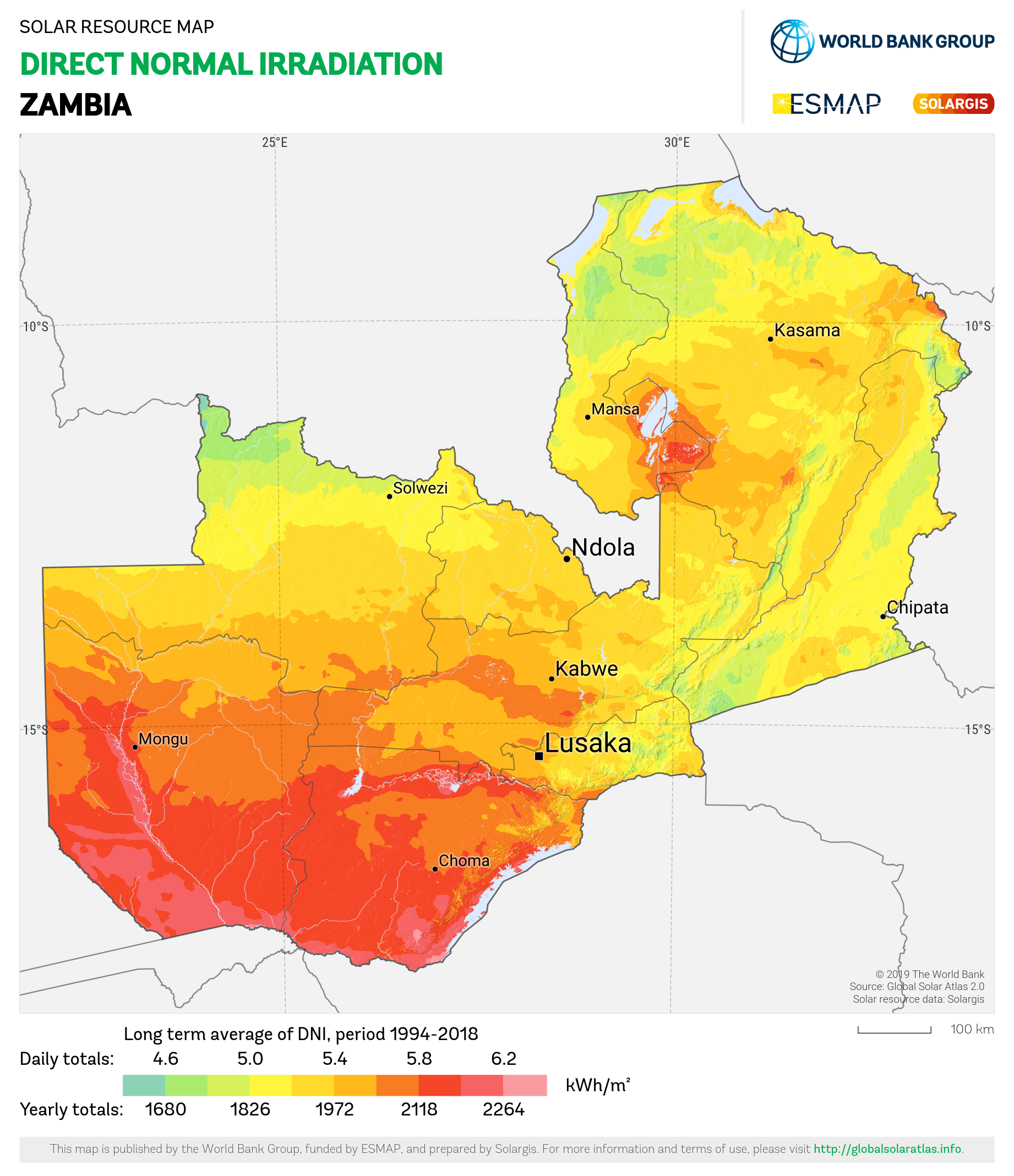
Download section feature with more than a thousand ready-to-use map images for countries and regions (example of Direct Normal Irradiation (DNI), Zambia)

The Global Solar Atlas (GSA) is a free, online, map-based application that provides information on solar resource and photovoltaic power potential globally. It features the online interactive map tools, simplified photovoltaic (PV) power calculator, reporting tools and the extensive download section. It is intended to provide policy makers, academia, and renewable energy stakeholders to raise awareness in the solar energy domain, support the development of policies and plans, and for initial zoning and site identification purposes.

== Background ==
The Global Solar Atlas is provided by the Energy Sector Management Assistance Program (ESMAP), a multi-donor trust funded program administered by the World Bank, and was developed under contract by Solargis, a provider of solar resource data and photovoltaic (PV) energy evaluation services.

The GSA provides an interactive map of solar resource and photovoltaic power potential and a variety of other environmental data relevant for understanding the practical and technical potential of solar power systems at any given geographic location. For the preliminary planning of photovoltaic power plants, users can easily calculate PV energy yield for a defined photovoltaic energy system. The results are presented in the form of reports and downloadable data files. The GSA also features a rich download section, organized on the level of countries or regions. It involves the popular solar resource maps in multiple languages, country fact-sheets and spatial data in a standard GIS format.

The Global Solar Atlas was launched by the World Bank and ESMAP in January 2017 in partnership with the International Solar Alliance. An improved version of the Global Solar Atlas (GSA 2.0) was launched in October 2019, with two further updates (GSA 2.1 and GSA 2.2) since then. All data and map products within GSA are licensed under the CC BY 4.0 licence.

The Global Wind Atlas is the parallel activity with comparable services for the wind power sector. The aim of both platforms is to support the scale up of renewable energy sources in the global energy mix, as mandated under Sustainable Development Goal 7.

== Methods and data ==
The solar resource data is supplied by the Solargis model. The model uses data from five geostationary satellites to calculate the attenuation effect of clouds and additional variables characterising the state of the atmosphere (such as aerosols/atmospheric pollution and water vapour). The history of 10/15/30-minute time-series of solar irradiance data is aggregated into long-term yearly or monthly averages, representing the climate reference. Data is available between the parallels 60°N and 55°S in the form of gridded data (rasters) with the nominal pixel size of 250 m. It is validated through ground-based measurement campaigns where possible. Several independent comparisons of solar radiation databases have been performed in recent years. Solargis has been repeatedly identified as the best performing database.

A PV power simulator is also operated by Solargis, and it calculates the conversion of the solar resource to electric power considering also the impact of air temperature, terrain horizon, ground albedo, as well as the configuration of the pre-selected PV power systems. Besides long-term yearly averages, the PV simulator also provides long-term monthly and hourly statistics.

== Features ==
Online map-based application:

- Interactive maps allow visualisation of global solar resource data at approx 250 m grid resolution, covering global horizontal irradiation (GHI), direct normal irradiation (DNI), diffuse horizontal irradiation (DIF), and also PV power potential (PVOUT) and air temperature (TEMP) data at approx. 1 km. The data can be visualised for any location or region; numeric values are provided for each map click;
- PV yield calculator allows calculation of long-term energy yield for a set of pre-defined PV power systems. Energy yield estimates are provided as 12x24 (month x hour), profiles allowing to understand seasonal variability of PV power generation;
- Tools for a regional assessment: Calculation of the basic solar and PV power potential statistics for any country, state or custom defined region
- Visualisation and interaction with the selected data from open energy system databases
- Downloadable reports and data files

Download section:

- Solar resource (GHI, DNI) and PV power potential maps in the poster-size and mid-size formats for 180+ countries and regions, useful for conceptual planning, education and visual presentation
- Gridded data in the standard GIS formats, available for further geo-spatial analysis for professional or academic tasks
- Global PV assessment and country fact-sheets provide extended solar and PV power potential statistics to help policy-makers, researchers and educators understand the theoretical and practical potential of solar energy in the regions of their interest.

== Usage ==
The Global Solar Atlas website serves over 23,000 users per month according to data from Google Analytics (June 2020). Data from GSA has been used in the number of scientific studies and R&D programmes. Only in 2019, Google Scholar noticed more than 200 individual scholarly literature, referring to GSA sources. It is regularly cited by those looking to highlight the solar resource potential globally, in a country or region, or to compare the resource potential between countries.

In addition, the data has or is being used by a number of other tools or studies as follows:

- ArcGIS: GIS layers from the Global Solar Atlas are available within the ArcGIS platform
- Green Growth Knowledge Platform: The Global Solar Atlas is listed as a data resource
- IRENA: GIS layers from the Global Solar Atlas are provided under the Global Atlas for Renewable Energy, a product of the International Renewable Energy Agency (IRENA)
- Technical Rooftop Solar PV Potential in Vietnam
- RETScreen

== See also ==
- Global Wind Atlas - the parallel initiative focused on wind energy resources
- Irradiance
- Photovoltaics
- Solar irradiance
- Solar power
