= LCPM =

LCPM may refer to:

- Least-cost planning methodology
- Life cycle project management
- Linear pulse-code modulation
- Liquid crystal phase modulator
- Low-Cost Planetary Missions Conference
- Low complexity parallel multiplier
