= Practical Solutions =

Practical Solutions is a new methodology by which public transportation systems manage, define, and deliver roadway projects in the United States. The idea seeks cost-effective solutions to meet community-defined outcomes. Practical Solutions incorporates concepts from the field of energy utilities such as least-cost planning, practical design, context-sensitive solutions, smart transportation, performance-based outcomes, and value engineering into one methodology to achieve results at the lowest cost to the public. Current states that have embarked in transitioning their State Departments of Transportation to this methodology in some form include: Pennsylvania, Missouri, Oregon, Washington, Kentucky, Tennessee, Colorado, California, and Hawaii.

From PennDOT's work, "Smart Transportation" or Practical Solutions is centered on these principles:

- Cost-effectiveness
- Planning and designing within the context of the community
- Choosing projects with high rate of return
- Improving the local transportation system, as well as that of the state
- Recognizing there are many other outcomes beyond level of service (delay)
- Safety being the most important metric, but for all modes of transportation and not just vehicles
- Maintaining and improving existing investments first
- Building Complete Communities through transportation investments
- Partnerships with local governments on land use is key to success
