= Wind resource assessment =

Estimation of the production of a wind farm

Wind resource assessment is the process by which wind power developers estimate the future energy production of a wind farm. Accurate wind resource assessments are crucial to the successful development of wind farms.

== History ==
Modern wind resource assessments have been conducted since the first wind farms were developed in the late 1970s. The methods used were pioneered by developers and researchers in Denmark, where the modern wind power industry first developed.

== Wind resource maps ==
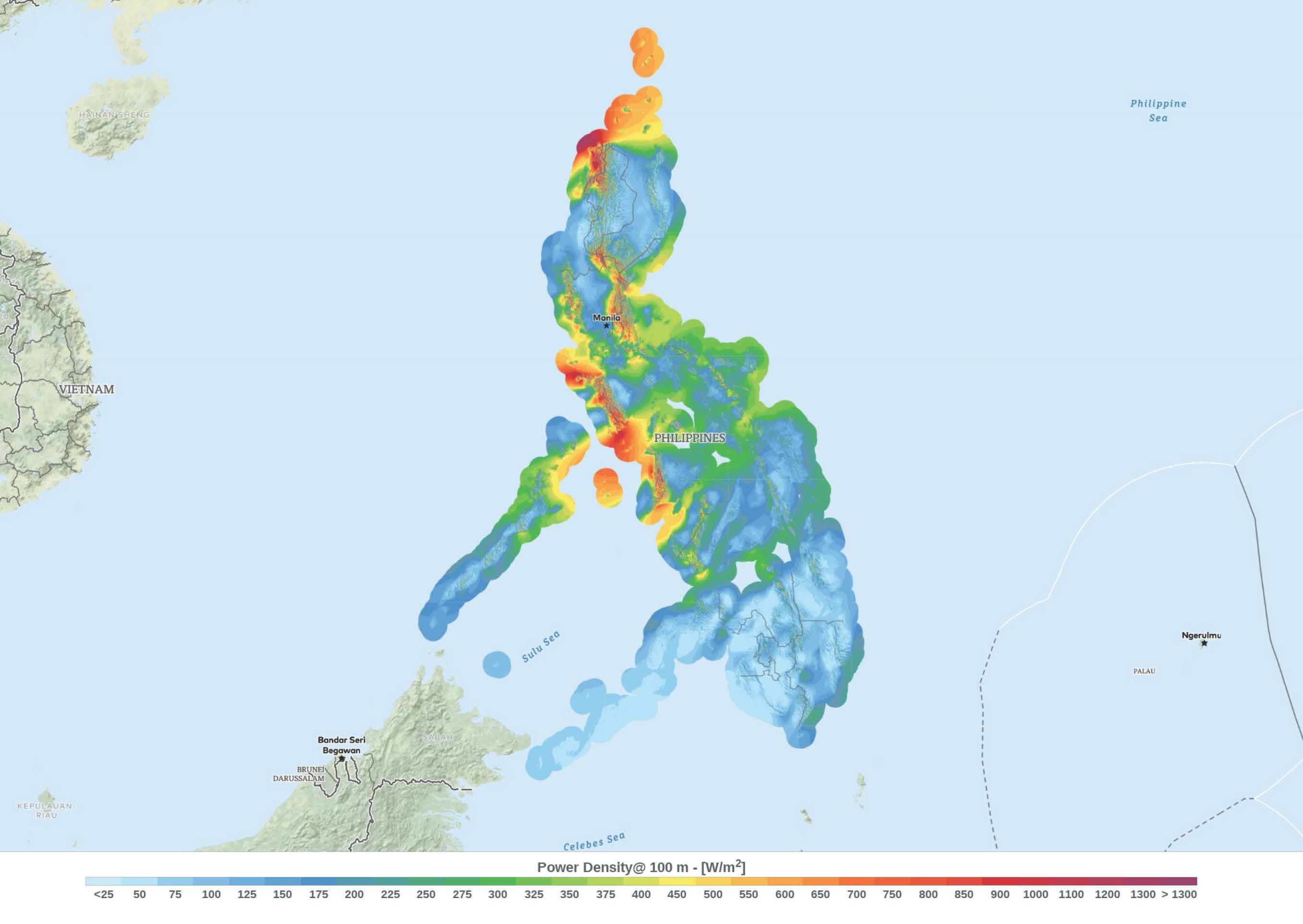
Wind resource map for the Philippines, from the Global Wind Atlas

High resolution mapping of wind power resource potential has traditionally been carried out at the country level by government or research agencies, in part due to the complexity of the process and the intensive computing requirements involved. However, in 2015 the Technical University of Denmark, under framework of the Clean Energy Ministerial, launched the Global Wind Atlas (version 1.0) to provide freely available data on wind resource potential globally. The Global Wind Atlas was relaunched in November 2017 (version 2.0) in partnership with the World Bank, with wind resource maps now available for all countries at 250m resolution.

Another similar international example is the European Wind Atlas, which is in the process of being updated under the New European Wind Atlas project funded by the European Union.

Examples of country wind resource maps include the Canadian Wind Atlas, the Wind Resource Atlas of the United States, and a series of wind maps published by the World Bank under an initiative launched by ESMAP in 2013 focused on developing countries. This followed a previous initiative of the United Nations Environment Program, the Solar and Wind Energy Resource Assessment (SWERA) project, which was launched in 2002 with funding from the Global Environment Facility. However, these country wind resource maps have been largely superseded by the Global Wind Atlas in terms of data quality, methodology, and output resolution.

The above global and country mapping outputs, and many others, are also available via the Global Atlas for Renewable Energy developed by the International Renewable Energy Agency (IRENA), which brings together publicly available GIS data on wind and other renewable energy resources.

Wind prospecting can begin with the use of such maps, but the lack of accuracy and fine detail make them useful only for preliminary selection of sites for collecting wind speed data. With increasing numbers of ground-based measurements from specially installed anemometer stations, as well as operating data from commissioned wind farms, the accuracy of wind resource maps in many countries has improved over time, although coverage in most developing countries is still patchy. In addition to the publicly available sources listed above, maps are available as commercial products through specialist consultancies, or users of GIS software can make their own using publicly available GIS data such as the US National Renewable Energy Laboratory's High Resolution Wind Data Set.

Although the accuracy has improved, it is unlikely that wind resource maps, whether public or commercial, will eliminate the need for on-site measurements for utility-scale wind generation projects. However, mapping can help speed up the process of site identification and the existence of high quality, ground-based data can shorten the amount of time that on-site measurements need to be collected.

In addition to 'static' wind resource atlases which average estimates of wind speed and power density across multiple years, tools such as Renewables.ninja provide time-varying simulations of wind speed and power output from different wind turbine models at an hourly resolution.

== Measurements ==
To estimate the energy production of a wind farm, developers must first measure the wind on site. Meteorological towers equipped with anemometers, wind vanes, and sometimes temperature, pressure, and relative humidity sensors are installed. Data from these towers must be recorded for at least one year to calculate an annually representative wind speed frequency distribution.

Measurements collected by remote sensing devices such as SODAR and LiDAR are gaining acceptance in the wind industry. For offshore measurement campaigns, floating LiDAR systems have become standard.

Since onsite measurements are usually only available for a short period, data is also collected from nearby long-term reference stations (usually at airports). This data is used to adjust the onsite measured data so that the mean wind speeds are representative of a long-term period for which onsite measurements are not available. Versions of these maps can be seen and used with software applications such as WindNavigator.

== Calculations ==
The following calculations are needed to accurately estimate the energy production of a proposed wind farm project:

- Correlations between onsite meteorological towers:
  - Multiple meteorological towers are usually installed on large wind farm sites. For each tower, there will be periods of time where data is missing but has been recorded at another onsite tower. Least squares linear regressions and other, more wind-specific regression methods can be used to fill in the missing data. These correlations are more accurate if the towers are located near each other (a few km distance), the sensors on the different towers are of the same type, and are mounted at the same height above the ground.
- Correlations between long term weather stations and onsite meteorological towers:
  - Because wind is variable year to year, and power produced is related to the cube of windspeed, short-term (< 5 years) onsite measurements can result in highly inaccurate energy estimates. Therefore, wind speed data from nearby longer term weather stations (usually located at airports) are used to adjust the onsite data. Least squares linear regressions are usually used, although several other methods exist as well.
- Vertical shear to extrapolate measured wind speeds to turbine hub height:
  - The hub heights of modern wind turbines are usually 80 m or greater, but developers are often reluctant to install towers taller than 60m due to the need for FAA permitting in the US, and costs. The power law and log law vertical shear profiles are the most common methods of extrapolating measured wind speed to hub height.
- Wind flow modeling to extrapolate wind speeds across a site:
  - Wind speeds can vary considerably across a wind farm site if the terrain is complex (hilly) or there are changes in roughness (the height of vegetation or buildings). Wind flow modeling software, based on either the traditional WAsP linear approach or the newer CFD approach, is used to calculate these variations in wind speed.
- Energy production using a wind turbine manufacturer's power curve:
  - When the long term hub height wind speeds have been calculated, the manufacturer's power curve is used to calculate the gross electrical energy production of each turbine in the wind farm.
- Application of energy loss factors:
  - To calculate the net energy production of a wind farm, the following loss factors are applied to the gross energy production:
    - wind turbine wake loss
    - wind turbine availability
    - electrical losses
    - blade degradation from ice/dirt/insects
    - high/low temperature shutdown
    - high wind speed shutdown
    - curtailments due to grid issues

== Software applications ==
Wind power developers use various types of software applications to assess wind resources.

=== Wind data management ===
Wind data management software assists the user in gathering, storing, retrieving, analyzing, and validating wind data. Typically the wind data sets are collected directly from a data logger, located at a meteorological monitoring site, and are imported into a database. Once the data set is in the database it can be analyzed and validated using tools built into the system or it can be exported for use in external wind data analysis software, wind flow modeling software, or wind farm modeling software.

Many data logger manufacturers offer wind data management software that is compatible with their logger. These software packages will typically only gather, store, and analyze data from the manufacturer's own loggers.

Third party data management software and services exist that can accept data from a wide variety of loggers and offer more comprehensive analysis tools and data validation.

=== Wind data analysis ===
Wind data analysis software assist the user in removing measurement errors from wind data sets and perform specialized statistical analysis.

=== Atmospheric simulation modeling ===
Wind flow modeling methods calculate very high-resolution maps of wind flow, often at horizontal resolution finer than 100-m. When doing fine resolution modeling, to avoid exceeding available computing resource, the typical model domains used by these small-scale models have a few kilometers in the horizontal direction and several hundred meters in the vertical direction. Models with such a small domain are not capable of capturing meso-scale atmospheric phenomena that often drive wind patterns. To over come this limitation nested modeling is sometimes used.

=== Wind flow modeling ===
Wind flow modeling software aims to predict important characteristics of the wind resource at locations where measurements are not available. The most commonly used such software application is WAsP, created at Risø National Laboratory in Denmark. WAsP uses a potential flow model to predict how wind flows over the terrain at a site. Meteodyn WT and WindStation are similar applications that use computational fluid dynamics (CFD) calculations instead, which are potentially more accurate, particularly for complex terrains.

=== Wind farm modeling ===
Wind farm modeling software aims to simulate the behavior of a proposed or existing wind farm, most importantly to calculate its energy production. The user can usually input wind data, height and roughness contour lines, wind turbine specifications, background maps, and define objects that represent environmental restrictions. This information is then used to design a wind farm that maximizes energy production while taking restrictions and construction issues into account. There are several wind farm modeling software applications available, including ZephyCFD, Meteodyn WT, Openwind, Windfarmer, WindPRO, WindSim, and WAsP.

=== Medium scale wind farm modelling ===
In recent years a new breed of wind farm development has grown from the increased need for distributed generation of electricity from local wind resources. This type of wind projects is mostly driven by land owners with high energetic requirements such as farmers and industrial site managers. A particular requirement from a wind modelling point of view is the inclusion of all local features such as trees, hedges and buildings as turbine hub-heights range from as little as 10m to 50m. Wind modelling approaches need to include these features but very few of the available wind modelling commercial software provide this capability. Several work groups have been set up around the world to look into this modelling requirement and companies including Digital Engineering Ltd (UK), NREL (USA), DTU Wind Energy (Denmark) are at the forefront of development in this area and look at the application of meso-CFD wind modelling techniques for this purpose.
