= Wind Data Generator =

The Wind Data Generator (WDG) is a wind energy software tool capable of running WRF (Weather Research and Forecasting Model) model to create a wind atlas and to generate wind data at any location, any height of interest for any resolution from 3 km to 10 km.

Before investing in the installation of a meteorological measurement mast tower, wind engineers use the WDG software to generate Virtual Met Masts (VMM) at any area of interest, and get 30+ years of hourly wind data (speed and direction). These data can be used to run pre-feasibility analyses and generate conceptual layouts for any wind turbine types. Doing so, site selection & ranking decision-making is based on optimized installed capacity (MW) and capacity factor numbers (MWh/year) even before having on-site mast data. The software has other interesting features such as micrositing, MCP, and extreme wind speed analyses that can be used to build more profitable wind farms (by reducing uncertainties) over the long-term (IEC standards).

The WDG is used worldwide to bring confidence on the project feasibility at the very early stages of project development in terms of both “quantity” (wind speed) and “quality” (shear, turbulence, inflow angles) of the wind.

== Model ==
The WRF model integrated in the WDG is a fully compressible and non-hydrostatic model. Its vertical coordinate is a terrain-following hydro-static pressure coordinate. The grid staggering is the Arakawa C-grid. The model uses the Runge-Kutta 2nd and 3rd order time integration schemes and 2nd to 6th order advection schemes in both horizontal and vertical directions. It uses a time-split small step for acoustic and gravity-wave modes. The dynamics conserves scalar variables.

== Innovation award ==
On April 9, 2014 in Paris, French-based MeteoPole was awarded an innovation award from the Massachusetts Institute of Technology (MIT) for the disruptive Wind Data Generator software, becoming the first wind power industry technology to be awarded by the MIT. The company’s CEO, Karim Fahssis, was also named by the MIT Technology Review as one of the world’s top 35 innovators of the year for introducing the path-breaking software to the wind industry. Previously, the MIT’s TR35 has awarded several of today’s global influencers, including Facebook CEO Mark Zuckerberg, and Google founders Larry Page and Sergey Brin.
