= WindSim =

WindSim is wind energy software that uses CFD to optimize wind turbine placement in onshore and offshore wind farms.
WindSim is used worldwide by wind resource assessment professionals to help design more profitable wind farms.

== History ==
WindSim was first developed by Vector AS, a consulting firm, as an internal tool used to build the Norwegian Wind Atlas in cooperation with Norwegian Meteorological Institute .
WindSim was productized for PC platforms in 2003.
The software developer and the software product are both named "WindSim".

== See also ==
- Wind energy software
- Wind resource assessment
- Wind power
