= QBlade =

Wind energy simulation program

- Stable release: QBlade-CE 2.0.6.3 win beta, 2.0.6.1 Linux beta / 21 June 2023; 3 years ago
- Operating system: Linux, Windows
- Available in: English
- Type: Wind energy software
- License: Academic Public License
- Website: qblade.org

QBlade is a public source, cross-platform simulation software for wind turbine blade design and aerodynamic simulation. It comes with a user-friendly graphical user interface (GUI) based on Qt.

== Overview ==
QBlade is a public source wind turbine calculation software, distributed under the Academic Public License. The software is seamlessly integrated into XFOIL, an airfoil design and analysis tool. The purpose of this software is the design and aerodynamic simulation of wind turbine blades. The integration in XFOIL allows for the user to rapidly design custom airfoils and compute their performance curves, Extrapolating the performance data to a range of 360°Angle of attack, and directly integrate them into a wind turbine rotor simulation. The graphical user interface, including a custom dynamic graph class for data visualizations makes this software accessible to a large potential user community.

QBlade is widely used for teaching, as it provides a ’hands-on’ feeling for Horizontal-axis wind turbine (HAWT) rotor design and shows all the fundamental relationships between blade twist, blade chord, section airfoil performance, turbine control, power and load curves that can be used. QBlade also includes post processing of conducted rotor simulations and gives deep insight into all relevant blade and rotor variables.

== Development History ==
QBlade's development was started in 2009 at the Hermann Föttinger Institute of TU Berlin. The 1st online version, released in 2010, was received with positive remarks which led to the continuation of the development. After the integration of a turbulent wind field generator, a Vertical Axis Wind Turbine (VAWT) module and a structural Euler-Bernoulli beam module (QFEM) an updated version (v0.8) of the software was released on 9 May 2014. An updated stable version (v0.96) was released in August 2015. This included a new aerodynamic module which replaced the BEM of QBlade with a new advanced Lifting Line Theory (LLT) module. Furthermore, a Free Wake Vortex model was implemented for the accurate representation of the near and far wake of the turbine. A new version of QBlade was released in August 2022. QBlade Community Edition (QBlade-CE 2.0.4) includes all functionality that is required for the aero-servo-hydro-elastic simulation of wind turbines. For the structural dynamics modelling QBlade integrates the Project Chrono multi-physics library.

== Functionality ==
The functionality of QBlade includes the following features:

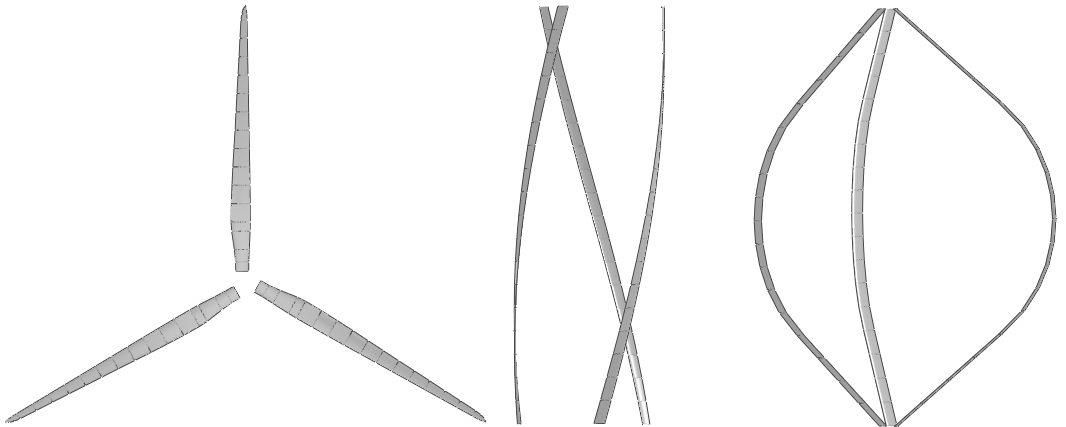
HAWT and VAWT Rotors designed with QBlade

- Airfoil generation and modification
- Polar generation and extrapolation
- Rotor design (HAWT and VAWT) including active elements (such as flaps) and damaged blade stations
- Propeller design
- Steady state BEM analysis, fully parallelized parametric BEM
- Structural turbine definition powered by Project Chrono
- Cable elements to model blade cables, guy wires or mooring lines.
- Custom substructure definition (monopile, jacket, floaters)
- Seamless integration of NREL’s TurbSim for turbulent windfield generation
- Linear wave generator (regular, irregular, custom and pre-defined spectra
- Controller Integration (Bladed style, DTU style, TUB style)
- Aero-servo-hydro-elastic wind turbine simulations
- Streamlined ASCII based import / export functionality for all objects in QBlade
- IEC compliant DLC pre-processor
- Multi turbine simulation
- Multi rotor turbine definition
- Full parallelization of aero-hydro-elastic simulations
- Command line interface
- Software in loop interface
- Modal analysis capabilities

== License ==
QBlade is distributed under the Academic Public License. It is maintained and continuously developed at the Hermann Föttinger Institute of TU Berlin (Chair of Fluid Dynamics) and at QBlade.org.

== Validation ==
QBlade has been successfully validated against the WT_Perf Blade Element Momentum Theory code of NWTC. Furthermore, it showed good agreement with the experimental performance data measured at the NASA Ames Research Center wind tunnel during the National Renewable Energy Laboratory 10m Wind Turbine Testing campaign

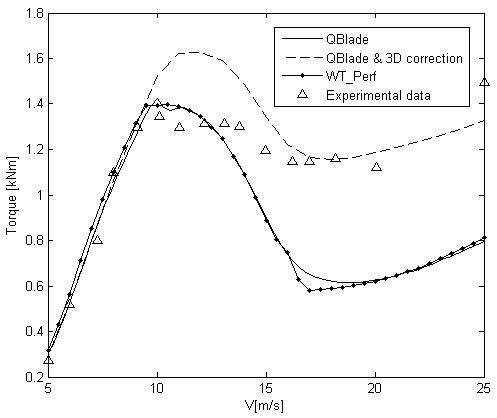
Graph of Rotor Torque over Wind Speed for a 10m rotor-diameter stall turbine. The turbine rotor design data are extracted from the NREL International Energy Agency Annex XIV and Annex XVIII turbine tested at the NASA Ames wind tunnel. The comparative curves represent the simulation results between QBlade and WT_Perf (BEM code of NREL)

== See also ==
- Wind energy software
- Blade element theory
- Momentum theory
- XFOIL
- Lifting Line Theory
