= Meteodyn WT =

Wind energy calculation software

- Developer(s): Meteodyn
- Initial release: September 9, 2009; 15 years ago
- Stable release: 1.10 / April 10, 2025; 22 days ago
- Operating system: Windows
- Available in: English, French, Spanish and Chinese Traditional
- Type: Wind energy software
- License: Proprietary software Commercial software
- Website: Meteodyn WT official website

Meteodyn WT, commonly known as Meteodyn is a wind energy software program that uses computational fluid dynamics (CFD) to conduct wind resource assessment. Developed and marketed by Meteodyn, Meteodyn WT was first released in September 2009. The software quantifies the wind resource in a desired terrain in order to assess the feasibility of a proposed wind farm. The software's objective is to design the most profitable wind farm. This is achieved by taking into account the measured wind data at a measurement tower and the terrain conditions. Both of these are essential to be able to obtain the wind conditions and therefore the wind resources of the desired terrain.

Meteodyn WT has been validated with actual wind measurements by independent studies.

Meteodyn WT is used by wind turbine manufacturers, wind farm developers, consulting firms and wind farm operators.

== Graphical user interface ==
The current version of Meteodyn WT displays all projects in one world map; this map already includes terrain and roughness data.

== Features ==
Meteodyn WT features a geographical data management tool, a meteorological data processing tool, a LIDAR correction tool, a wind turbine creation tool, a wind turbines micro-siting tool, a wind atlas tool and an auto-convergence tool.

It also includes the following functions: wind resource mapping, wake effect computation, annual energy production (AEP) with / without wake effect, directional wind shear at each turbine, wind and turbulence matrices at each turbine, IEC compliance, automatic report generation, losses and uncertainties.

== Compatibility with other software ==
The current version of Meteodyn WT exports to the following wind energy software formats: .wrg, .rsf, .wrb, .fmv and .flowres. Google earth and Surfer export formats are also available.

== Solution method ==
Meteodyn WT uses computational fluid dynamics (CFD) which directly takes into consideration the geometry of the terrain in question. The software solves the Navier-Stokes equations numerically by using the K-L turbulence model. This technique to solve the Navier-Stokes equations takes into account the stability of the atmosphere.

== Language ==
Meteodyn WT is available in English, French, Standard Chinese and Spanish.

== Ports ==
=== Microsoft Windows ===
Meteodyn WT is a proprietary software package created for Microsoft Windows and usually, any new Meteodyn WT version supports the current Microsoft Windows version and some older ones. Meteodyn WT 5.3.2 supports Windows 7 up to Windows 10. Meteodyn WT 6 supports Windows 8 up to Windows 10. Meteodyn WT 1.10 supports Windows 10, Windows 11, Windows Server 2019 and Windows Server 2022.

== See also ==
- Computational fluid dynamics
- Wind resource assessment
