= Integrated resource planning =

Integrated resource planning (IRP, also least-cost utility planning, LCUP) is a form of least-cost planning used by the public utilities. The goal is to meet the expected long-term growth of demand with minimal cost, using a wide selection of means, from supply-side (increasing production and/or purchasing the supply) to demand-side (reducing the consumption). For example, for an electric utility the US law defines IRP as a planning process that evaluates the full range of alternatives, including new generating capacity, power purchases, energy conservation and efficiency, cogeneration and district heating and cooling applications. The methodology requires the utility to be able to influence all aspects of the supply chain from production to consumption, so in the US it is used by many vertically integrated (non-deregulated) ones. IRP effectively ends with deregulation. The deregulated utilities (the ones that are customer-facing, without the generation plants) still can engage in the IRP, and some interest returned in late 2010s.

== Background ==
Historically, utilities had approached long-term planning from the supply-side (for an electric utility, more generation, transmission, distribution). However, the benefits of its consumption cannot be measured directly in kilowatt-hours; electricity is converted into other services, so improvements of the efficiency of the industrial equipment, lighting, air conditioning, household appliances can be potentially a more cost-efficient way to accommodate growth. Under the pressure of environmentalists, the IRP use started in the US in the middle of 1970s with California taking the lead, and by the 1990s the use of IRP in most of the United States was either mandated or under considerations, Europe was lagging behind.

In the perfect electricity market IRP is not needed: the demand-side would adjust on its own by the cost-reduction on the consumer size. In practice, there are many hindrances on the way of the consumer to a more efficient behavior:

- lack of information, especially for residential and small business customers. Utilities need to plan for information and auditing actions to overcome this problem;
- high payback expectations. A typical consumer expects a high return-on-investment (a payback in 2–3 years). This outsized expectation (utilities operate on 5-10% ROI) can be explained by a high degree of uncertainty on the consumer side (e.g., consumers are unaware of the utility rates if the far future), absence of incentives in some cases (e.g., an owner of apartment building does not pay for the electricity and thus has no reason to pay for the improvements), high equipment costs. Utilities can improve the situation by using a leverage they have with manufacturers by ordering equipment for the improvements in bulk.

== Advantages and disadvantages ==
The use of IRP brings many economic and quality of living benefits:

- greater efficiency and lower risk for the utility;
- reduced environmental impacts;
- improvement of relations between the utility and its customers through the customers' input into the IRP process;
- better load forecasting through a deeper understanding of the demand-side behavior;
- greater utilization of the variable renewable energy resources;
- opening new business opportunities and improving local employment related to the installation of equipment.

IRP comes with its own set of drawbacks:

- higher electricity rates may be needed for the utility to recover the investment (IRP only gained momentum once the utilities were allowed to pass the investments into conservation onto customers through higher rates). The increased rates will affect some consumers disproportionally, creating the equity problems;
- government mandating the utility to directly subsidize the low-income residential customers, thus engaging in a forced charity;
- the energy savings and cost of the demand side management are hard to measure, unlike the expenses and results of the capacity improvements, and a too optimistic estimate of the savings can translate into problems with the resource adequacy.

== Sources ==
- Almeida, Anibal T. (1994). "An Introduction to Integrated Resource Planning". Integrated Electricity Resource Planning. Springer Netherlands. pp. 1–34. doi:10.1007/978-94-011-1054-9_1. ISBN 978-94-010-4458-5.
- Hirst, E; Goldman, C (November 1991). "Creating the Future: Integrated Resource Planning for Electric Utilities". Annual Review of Energy and the Environment. 16 (1): 91–121. doi:10.1146/annurev.eg.16.110191.000515. ISSN 1056-3466.
- Carvallo, Juan Pablo; Larsen, Peter H.; Sanstad, Alan H; Goldman, Charles A. (19 July 2017), Load Forecasting in Electric Utility Integrated Resource Planning, Office of Scientific and Technical Information (OSTI), doi:10.2172/1371722, OSTI 1371722, S2CID 168747111
- Rotenberg, Edan (2005). "Energy Efficiency in Regulated and Deregulated Markets" (PDF). UCLA Journal of Environmental Law and Policy. 24 (1). doi:10.5070/L5241019530. eISSN 1942-8553. ISSN 0733-401X.
- Timney, Mary M. (29 April 2015). "Restructuring electricity". Power for the People: Protecting States' Energy Policy Interests in an Era of Deregulation. Routledge. ISBN 978-1-317-46228-6.
- Bertschi, Scott F. (1994). "Integrated Resource Planning and Demand-Side Management in Electric Utility Regulation: Public Utility Panacea or a Waste of Energy?". Emory Law Journal. 43 (2): 815–851.
