= RETScreen =

Energy Management Software

- Developer: Government of Canada | Multiple
- Release: April 30, 1998; 28 years ago
- Stable release: RETScreen Expert Version 9.0 / 29 September 2022; 3 years ago
- Operating system: Windows
- Size: 358 MB
- Available in: 37 languages
- List of languages Arabic, Bengali, Bulgarian, Chinese, Croatian, Czech, Danish, Dutch, English, Farsi, Finnish, French, German, Greek, Hindi, Hungarian, Indonesian, Italian, Japanese, Korean, Macedonian, Mongolian, Polish, Portuguese, Romanian, Russian, Serbian, Spanish, Swahili, Swedish, Tagalog, Telugu, Thai, Turkish, Ukrainian, Urdu, Vietnamese
- Website: www.retscreen.net

The RETScreen Clean Energy Management Software (usually shortened to RETScreen Expert) is a software package developed by the Government of Canada. RETScreen Expert was highlighted at the 2016 Clean Energy Ministerial held in San Francisco. The Government of Canada's Treasury Board Secretariat uses RETScreen Expert as its greenhouse gas reporting tool for all federal departments and agencies required to report emissions.

RETScreen Expert is the current version of the software and was released to the public on September 19, 2016. The software allows for the comprehensive identification, assessment and optimization of the technical and financial viability of potential renewable energy, energy efficiency and cogeneration projects; the measurement and verification of the actual performance of facilities; the identification of energy savings/production opportunities; and portfolio management of multiple facilities. "Viewer mode" in RETScreen Expert is free and permits access to significant functionality of the software. Unlike past versions of RETScreen, however, a new "Professional mode" (which allows users to save and print, as well as to access premium features) is now available on an annual subscription basis.

Unlike the previous RETScreen Suite, RETScreen Expert is one integrated software platform. It utilizes detailed and comprehensive archetypes for assessing projects and includes portfolio analysis capability. RETScreen Expert integrates a number of databases to assist the user, including a global database of climatic conditions obtained from 6,700 ground-based stations and NASA satellite data; benchmark database; cost database; project database; hydrology database and product database. The software contains extensive integrated training material, including an electronic textbook.

== History ==
The first version of RETScreen was released on April 30, 1998. RETScreen Version 4 was launched on December 11, 2007, at Bali, Indonesia by Canada's Minister of the Environment. RETScreen Plus was released in 2011. RETScreen Suite (integrating RETScreen 4 and RETScreen Plus with numerous additional upgrades), was released in 2012. RETScreen Expert was released to the public on September 19, 2016. RETScreen Expert Version 8.1 was released on September 21, 2021.

== Partners ==
RETScreen is managed under the leadership and ongoing financial support of the CanmetENERGY Varennes Research Centre of Natural Resources Canada, a department of the Government of Canada. The core team leverages collaboration with a number of other government and multilateral organisations, with technical support from a large network of experts from industry, government and academia. Principal external partners include NASA's Langley Research Center, Ontario's Independent Electricity System Operator (IESO), the Renewable Energy and Energy Efficiency Partnership (REEEP), UNEP's Energy Unit of the Division of Technology, Industry and Economics, the Global Environment Facility (GEF), the World Bank's Prototype Carbon Fund, and York University's Sustainable Energy Initiative.

== Examples of use ==
As of August 2021, the RETScreen software had more than 750,000 users in nearly every country and territory of the world.

An independent impact study estimated that by 2013, the use of the RETScreen software had been responsible, worldwide, for over $8 billion in user transaction cost savings, 20 MT per year of greenhouse gas emissions reductions, and has enabled at least 24 GW of installed clean energy capacity.

RETScreen is widely used to facilitate and implement clean energy projects. For example, RETScreen has been used:

- to retrofit the Empire State Building with energy efficiency measures
- at the manufacturing facilities of 3M Canada
- extensively by the Irish wind industry to analyze potential new projects
- to monitor the performance of hundreds of schools in Ontario
- by Manitoba Hydro's combined heat & power (bioenergy optimization) program to screen project applications
- to manage energy on university and college campuses
- in a multi-year assessment and evaluation of photovoltaic performance in Toronto, Canada
- to analyze solar air heating at U.S. Air Force installations
- for municipal facilities, including identifying opportunities for energy efficiency retrofits in various Ontario municipalities.

An extensive collection of posts and articles detailing how RETScreen has been used in different contexts is available on RETScreen's LinkedIn page and archived website.

The use of RETScreen is mandated or recommended by clean energy incentive programs at all levels of government worldwide, including the UNFCCC and the EU; Canada, New Zealand and the UK; numerous American states and Canadian provinces; cities and municipalities; and utilities. National and regional RETScreen training workshops have been conducted upon the official request of the Governments of Chile, Saudi Arabia, 15 countries in West and Central Africa, and the Latin American Energy Organization (OLADE).

== Awards and recognition ==
In 2010, RETScreen International was awarded the Public Service Award of Excellence, the highest award given by the Canadian government to its civil servants.

RETScreen and the RETScreen team have been nominated for and received numerous other prestigious awards including the Ernst & Young/Euromoney Global Renewable Energy Award, Energy Globe (National Award for Canada), and the GTEC Distinction Award Medal.

== Reviews ==
An International Energy Agency review of the beta release of the hydropower part of the software described it as "very impressive". The European Environment Agency asserts that RETScreen an "extremely useful tool." RETScreen has also been called "one of the few software tools, and by far the best, available for evaluating the economics of renewable energy installations" and "a tool to enhance... market coherence" in clean energy worldwide.

== See also ==
- Renewable Energy
- Energy management software
