= XFOIL =

Interactive program for design and analysis of airfoils

- Written in: Fortran
- License: GPL
- Website: web.mit.edu/drela/Public/web/xfoil

XFOIL is an interactive program for the design and analysis of subsonic isolated airfoils. Given the coordinates specifying the shape of a 2D airfoil, Reynolds and Mach numbers, XFOIL can calculate the pressure distribution on the airfoil and hence lift and drag characteristics. The program also allows inverse design - it will vary an airfoil shape to achieve the desired parameters. It is released under the GNU GPL.

== History ==
XFOIL was first developed by Mark Drela at MIT as a design tool for the MIT Daedalus project in the 1980s. It was further developed in collaboration with Harold Youngren. The current version is 6.99, released in December 2013. Despite its age, it is still widely used.

XFOIL is written in FORTRAN.

== Similar software ==
- Xfoil for matlab is a port of the original XFOIL code to MATLAB.
- mfoil is a MATLAB script that uses almost the same physical models as XFOIL, but it is not based on XFOIL. It is also available as a Python script.
- Vibefoil is a numerically faithful port of XFOIL to Javascript, which runs in the web browser.
- JavaFoil is an independent airfoil analysis software written in Java.
- XFLR5 is an analysis tool for airfoils, wings and planes operating at low Reynolds Numbers, that has implemented XFOIL's Direct and Inverse analysis capabilities.
- QBlade implements XFOIL via XFLR5 for use in wind turbine design.
- OpenVSP is a parametric aircraft geometry and aerodynamic analysis tool supported by NASA.
