= One Power Company =

American wind energy project developing company

- Type: Privately held
- Industry: Wind energy and utilities
- Founded: 2009
- Founder: Jereme Kent, CEO
- Headquarters: Findlay, Ohio, U.S.
- Services: Financing, developing, engineering, procuring for, constructing, and operating industrial power projects
- Number of employees: 50+
- Website: https://onepower.com/

One Power Company, formerly known as One Energy, is a private American industrial power company headquartered in Findlay, Ohio, that constructs, owns, and operates industrial power systems and infrastructure. It is the largest installer of on-site megawatt-scale wind energy in the United States, responsible for over 40% of all distributed wind energy installed in the United States in 2019.

The company has developed multiple energy services aimed at helping its customers directly power industrial operations. In addition to its Wind for Industry and Managed High Voltage services, One Power also designed and installed the first fully digital, transmission-voltage substation in 2023.

== History ==
One Power Company was founded in 2009 in Marshall, Minnesota. In 2011, the company moved its office to Findlay, Ohio, where it installed a project for Cooper Farms in Van Wert, Ohio. Since then, One Power has continued to develop projects consisting of typically 1-3 wind turbines (each 1.5 MW) of on-site wind energy for industrial energy users.

Other companies under One Power include One Power Solutions LLC, One Power Energy Services, One Energy Capital LLC, and One Energy Capital Corporation. The company's customers include Fortune 500 companies. In 2014, the company began its "Megawatt Scholarship" program, which offers a $5,000 scholarship per turbine per year to local high school graduates pursuing a degree in a STEM field. In August 2017, Goldwind Americas signed a deal with One Power to deliver up to 60 MW worth of turbine parts, which One Power stocks at the North Findlay Electrified Industrial Park to be used for lower lead time with future projects.

== Products and services ==
=== Wind for Industry ===
The company's main service, named Wind for Industry, describes wind energy projects in which utility-scale wind turbines are installed on-site and interconnected on a facility's side of their utility meter (a process known as distributed generation or behind-the-meter wind, which sometimes follows net metering). These projects are designed to achieve a significant reduction of an industrial facility's electrical consumption from the grid.

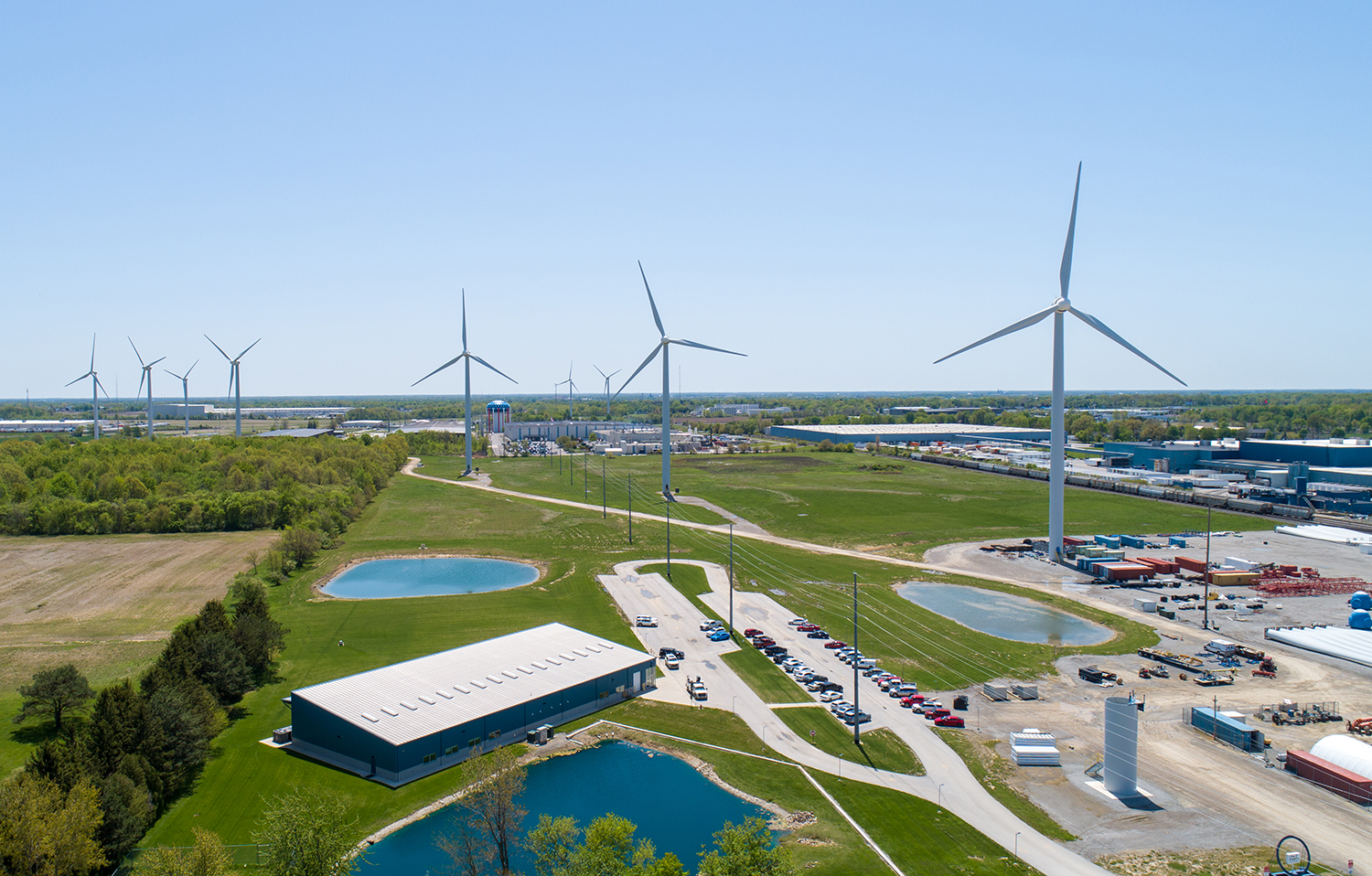
One Power's headquarters at the North Findlay Electrified Industrial Park

=== Capabilities ===
One Power is a vertically integrated company, capable of financing, developing, engineering, procuring for, constructing, and operating projects. The company completes conceptual engineering in-house, referring to third-party engineers for quality control. Due Diligence conducted in-house includes financial projections and modeling, custom studies, management of permitting and utilities, as well as wind mapping and analysis.

One Power typically offers companies a Power purchase agreement (PPA), which allows customers to pay a fixed rate for the energy produced by the project for the 20-year duration of production. With the PPA financial method, One Power covers capital expenditure for the project. Alternatively, customers may choose to purchase the turbines upfront, supplying capital expenditure themselves. Renewable Energy Credits (RECs) can also be involved. Proprietary software tools created by the company are used to execute studies regarding sound, microwave, shadow flicker, ice throw, and wake interference for potential turbine sites. One Power obtains land and FAA permits on behalf of their clients, permits utility interconnection, and serves as a liaison between customers and local authorities.
