= Latin Americans Energy Organization =

Public international entity to manage energy resources

The Latin-American Energy Organization (OLADE) is a public international entity serving to manage and protect energy resources in South America and the Caribbean. OLADE is a mediator between Latin American countries and the Caribbean, encouraging cooperation and clear statistics of energy consumption. There are 27 participating member Latin American countries that confers with the OLADE.

All portions of Latin American and the Caribbean

== Participating Latin - American Countries and the Caribbean ==
- Argentina
- Barbados
- Belize
- Bolivia
- Brazil
- Colombia
- Costa Rica
- Cuba, Chile
- Ecuador
- El Salvador
- Grenada
- Guatemala
- Guyana
- Haiti
- Honduras
- Jamaica
- Mexico
- Nicaragua
- Panama
- Paraguay
- Peru
- Dominican Republic
- Suriname
- Trinidad & Tobago
- Uruguay
- Venezuela

== How a member state enters and leaves the OLADE ==
For a member state to official join OLADE is must fall under these criteria:

- A sovereign and Independent state
- Located in Latin American Territory
- Agrees to fulfill all internal procedures and expenses to join

For a member state wishing to Leave OLADE they can do so at any time but still has rights and obligations to OLADE for thirty days. After which they are free to leave.

If a member state wishes to come back to OLADE it must be approved by the Meeting of Ministers and follow the regular requirements.

== Establishment and Missions ==
The Latin Energy Organization was established in 1973 and it mission it to create an equal economic relationship between the developing countries and developed countries of Latin American and the Caribbean.

While also providing a platform for Latin American countries to speak on about energy, the organization also does acts of:

- defending of natural resources
- Addressing issues that rise within the energy market of good and demands
- cooperating in creating sustainable and comprehensive polices

== Governing Bodies ==
Within the Latin American Energy Organization, there are four governing bodies that manage the Organization.

Meeting of the Ministers:

The highest governing body in the OLADE. This governing body consists of a minister from each participating member state coming together to create a general policy. This policy must be in line with the Lima Agreement.

Council of Experts:

This is the advisory group of the Meeting of the Ministers. This governing body aims to provide advice and review of proposal to ministerial decision-making across the OLADE.

Directive committee (CODI):

The CODI is the check and balances governing body. This body main purpose is to observe and assess OLADE's policies, strategies, and programs.

Permanent Secretariat:

Position in OLADE which is responsible for implementing programs and policies.

== OLADE assistance in agreement ==
The OLADE has greatly helped in some Latin American agreements, which includes:

- Inter-American Development Bank - the Panama Agreement
- Organization of the Petroleum Exporting countries (OPEC) - Guatemala Agreements
- Binational agreement between Ecuador and Colombia

== Current events ==
October 5, 2022:

Latin America Energy Organization and Global Energy Alliance for people and planet agreements in supporting sustainable transition to energy resources in Latin American and the Caribbean.

September 20, 2022:

International Atomic Energy Agency and Latin America Energy Organization agreements if exchanging on developments and energy power tools in the aim of transitioning to cleaner energy.

== Current Executive Secretariat ==
The active executive secretariat of OLADE is Andrés Rebolledo Smitman. He is an economist graduating from the University of Chile and has served as a consultant to the International- American development bank (IDB).

Years in position

- 2023-2025
