= Wind atlas =

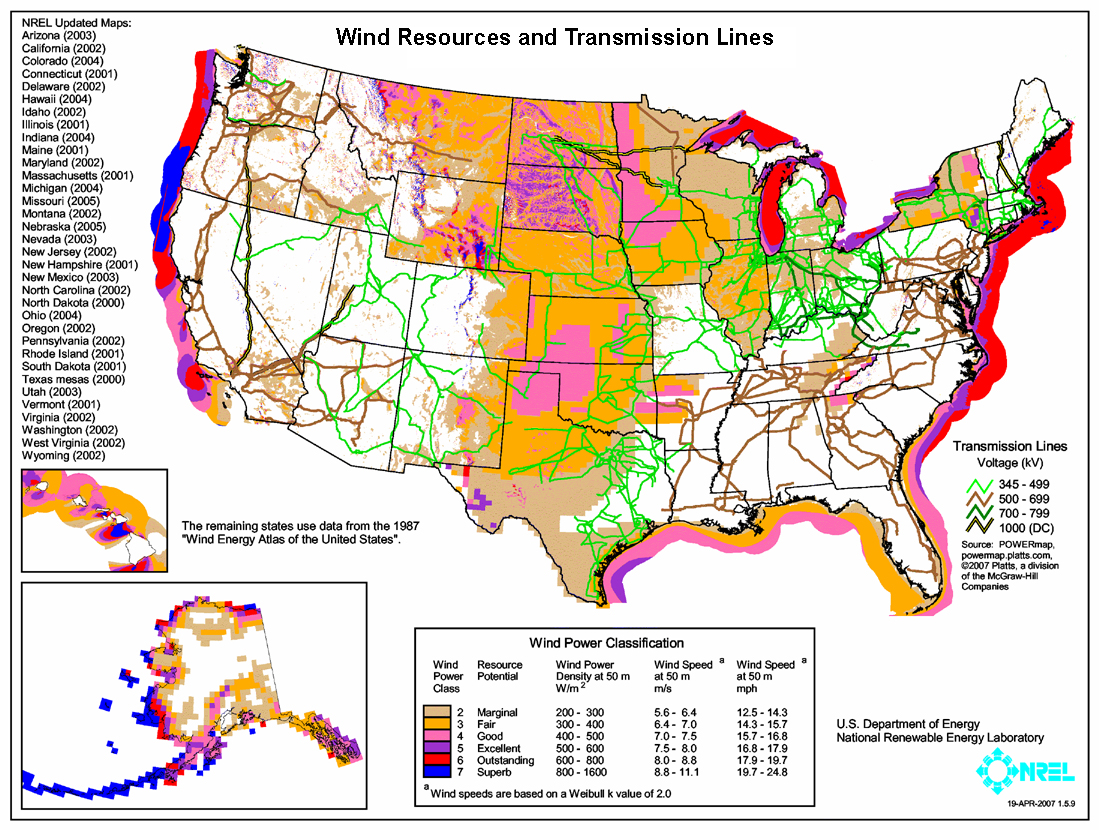
Map of available wind power for the United States. Color codes indicate wind power density class.

A wind atlas contains data on the wind speed and wind direction in a region. These data include maps, but also time series or frequency distributions. A climatological wind atlas covers hourly averages at a standard height (10 meters) over even longer periods (30 years) but depending on the application there are variations in averaging time, height and period.

== Application ==
A wind atlas is employed when pre-selecting wind farm sites. The required data includes 10-minute averaged wind at heights between 30 and 100 meters over a 10 to 20-year period.

== History ==
Using wind for energy is an idea first brought about by James Blyth, who is believed to have made the first wind turbine in Scotland in 1887. In the United States Charles Bush developed the first wind turbine in Ohio a year later.

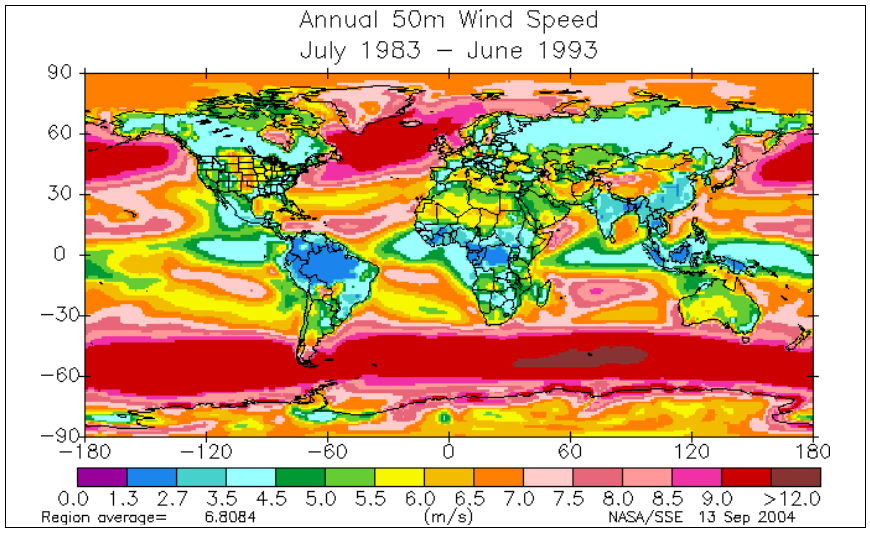
Global Annual 50m Average Wind Speed wind atlas

The first well-known wind atlas was the European Wind Atlas, published in 1989. Russia published a wind atlas in 2000, followed by Egypt in 2006. A global wind atlas was then made in order to help as many countries as possible.

== Examples ==
At least one wind atlas covers the globe, and other wind atlases cover the EU12 countries and the European offshore regions. Wind atlases have also been compiled for many countries or regions.
