= Energy Sector Management Assistance Program =

- Abbreviation: ESMAP
- Formation: 1983
- Type: IGO
- Legal status: Multi-Donor Trust Fund
- Purpose: Energy access, energy transition and poverty reduction
- Headquarters: Washington, D.C.
- Location: Washington, DC, United States
- Region served: Global
- Official language: English
- Practice Managers: Chandrasekar Govindarajalu & Fanny Missfeldt-Ringus
- Parent organization: The World Bank
- Staff: 45+
- Website: www.esmap.org

The Energy Sector Management Assistance Program (ESMAP) is a World Bank trust fund focused on solving energy challenges in emerging and developing markets.

Located at the World Bank's headquarters in Washington, DC, it is managed and staffed by the World Bank but funded separately by government and philanthropic donors. ESMAP helps create energy access for all by 2030 (SDG 7) and works to ensure that energy is generated with ever less carbon emissions in emerging markets and developing countries.

It also prepares vulnerable countries' energy sectors for the impacts of climate change by adapting and increasing resilience.

== History ==
Established in 1983, ESMAP was part of the World Bank's responses to the crippling impact high prices had on oil-importing developing countries during the global energy crisis of the late 1970s. Initially, the trust fund turned recommendations of the World Bank's Energy Sector Assessment Reports into advice for governments facing energy challenges.

Subsequently, ESMAP's work changed and expanded, but this basic mandate still forms the core of its work.

Since its inception more than 40 years ago, ESMAP has provided knowledge in energy access, decarbonization, and renewable energy in emerging and developing economies. It has supported innovative technologies, such as off-grid solar, mini grids, and battery storage. During the 1990s, ESMAP focused on increasing the availability of energy services for poverty alleviation and social development by integrating work on market development with that on energy access.

At the beginning of the 21st century, ESMAP included the nexus between energy security, energy access, and climate change in its work, mirroring the changing landscape of energy challenges. ESMAP has assisted client countries in reducing their energy sectors’ susceptibility to climate variability while transitioning to a low carbon development path in support of poverty reduction and economic growth.

Among the six Global Challenge Programs of the World Bank's 2024 Evolution Roadmap, ESMAP is at the heart of the Energy Challenge which emphasizes the energy transition and universal access to modern, reliable, and affordable electricity.

Since inception, ESMAP has operated in over 100 countries across more than 800 activities covering a broad range of energy issues.

== Mission and Objectives ==
ESMAP's objectives in helping to solve energy challenges in emerging and developing markets are to (a) ensure universal access to affordable, reliable, and modern energy services by 2030; (b) accelerate the transition towards a sustainable, just, and decarbonized energy system; and (c) ensure the resilience and adaptation of the energy sector to the growing impacts of climate change and other shocks.

ESMAP pursues these objectives through a trifecta of activities:

It synthesizes implementation experience into accessible research, aggregates data, and makes policy recommendations, ranging from issues such as how to set up solar mini grids to hydrogen project financing to fossil fuel energy reform.

It advises World Bank energy projects in emerging markets and developing countries, helping to plan off grid solar solutions in rural Nigeria, convert coal power plants in South Africa, or position windfarms off the Brazilian coast.

It focuses on setting projects up for success at the design- and early implementation stage, making donor contributions available as grants for planning and feasibility studies. It also mobilizes financing from other sources, including the private sector.

== Structure and Governance ==
ESMAP is fully integrated within the World Bank's energy practice, allowing its technical expertise to directly inform the World Bank's policy dialogue and lending operations. The program operates under the World Bank's administrative and fiduciary policies and procedures.

ESMAP is led by two Practice Managers. As World Bank staff members, they report to the Senior Director of the World Bank's Energy and Extractives Practice Group. Its governance is managed through a Consultative Group comprising representatives from donor organizations, which provides strategic direction and oversight. ESMAP also benefits from technical guidance through its Technical Advisory Group.

The ESMAP program is implemented by a team of over 50 energy and development experts who work at the forefront of energy sector transformation, developing cutting-edge knowledge and providing technical assistance to client countries.

== Key Activities and Impact ==
=== Knowledge and Expertise ===
ESMAP functions as a think tank developing global and country-specific data sets and analytical products, including:

• The Multi-Tier Framework for Energy Access (MTF), which measures electricity access across multiple dimensions.

• Regulatory Indicators for Sustainable Energy (RISE), a diagnostic tool for assessing countries' policy environments.

• The Global Electricity Regulatory Index (GERI), developed with the African Development Bank.

• The SDG7 Tracking Report. Its five custodians—UN agencies, IRENA, World Health Organization (WHO), IEA, and the World Bank—publish an annual report tracking progress toward achieving SDG7. The report informs development partners on where to focus efforts to close gaps in sustainable energy for all.

=== Catalytic Initiatives ===
ESMAP has launched several high-impact initiatives:

• The Energy Storage Partnership (ESP), which enabled low-income countries to develop energy storage solutions and helped mobilize over $1 billion for battery storage development.

• The Hydrogen for Development (H4D) partnership launched at COP27, involving 16 government agencies and private companies.

• The Clean Cooking Fund (CCF), which supports scaling up access to clean cooking solutions.

=== ESMAP and Mission 300 ===
As part of Mission 300, the World Bank's and African Development Bank's commitment to deliver electricity to 300 million Africans by 2030, ESMAP worked with governments and development partners to create integrated energy access strategies, ensuring they are cost-effective and sustainable.

Includes mobilizing grant funding for distributed renewable energy (DRE) projects, tapping into climate financing, and championing innovative solutions like mini-grids and standalone solar systems.

12 countries’ Electrification Compacts, announced at the end of January 2025. They outline how each government will accelerate access to electricity and build on ESMAP-supported national electrification strategies and least-cost access plans.

== Funding and Partnerships ==
ESMAP is funded by a coalition of over 20 partners, including governments and foundations. Major donors include:

Government Partners

Austria, Canada, Denmark, European Commission, Finland, France, Germany, Iceland, Italy, Japan, Luxembourg, Netherlands, Norway, Spain, Sweden, Switzerland, and the United Kingdom.

Foundation Partners

ClimateWorks Foundation, Global Energy Alliance for People and Planet (GEAPP), and Rockefeller Foundation.

Strategic Partnerships

ESMAP forms partnerships to extend its impact. Examples include:

• UN Agencies and International Organizations: International Energy Agency (IEA), International Renewable Energy Agency (IRENA), United Nations Statistics Division (UNSD), World Health Organization (WHO).

• Industry Associations: Global Off-Grid Lighting Association (GOGLA).

• Development Initiatives: Sustainable Energy for All (SEforALL), the Global Energy Alliance for People and Planet (GEAPP).

• Global financing vehicles: Green Climate Fund (GCF), Climate Investment Funds (CIF), Global Infrastructure Facility (GIF).

For the FY2021-24 business plan period, ESMAP mobilized approximately $541 million in funding, with donor contributions averaging about $125 million per year.
