= Least-cost planning methodology =

Economics technique

Least-cost planning methodology (LCPM), also referred to as least-cost planning (LCP) is a relatively new technique used by economists for making rational decisions about investments in transport and other urban infrastructure projects.

It is based on cost–benefit analysis. However, it is more comprehensive in that it looks at not only the total costs and total benefits for an individual project, but it also examines the total costs and benefits for all alternatives or combinations thereof and treats them on an "equal footing." These alternatives include not only construction projects but also demand reduction measures, such as road pricing, developing more walkable neighbourhoods and promoting remote work. When the method is applied to public utility planning, a term integrated resource planning is typically used (a.k.a. "least-cost utility planning", LCUP).

Equal footing means that there is no discrimination against some alternatives based on political or ideological factors.

LCPM itself is generally more costly than cost–benefit analysis, because of the requirement to study objectively all potential alternatives. However, it can provide large savings to taxpayers because it will do a better job of selecting those projects which maximise benefits while minimising costs.

There has been a trend in the US towards making LCPM mandatory for regional transport plans. For example, it has been required by Washington State law (RCW 47.80.030) for regional transport plans since July 1, 1994.

== Sources ==
- Almeida, Anibal T. (1994). "An Introduction to Integrated Resource Planning". Integrated Electricity Resource Planning. Springer Netherlands. pp. 1–34. doi:10.1007/978-94-011-1054-9_1.
