= WAsP =

WAsP (Wind Atlas Analysis and Application Program) is a Windows program for predicting wind climates, wind resources, and energy yields from wind turbines and wind farms. An application of the software is determining good locations to develop wind farms.

The predictions are based on wind data measured at meteorological stations in the same region, or on generalised wind climates derived from mesoscale model results. The program includes a complex terrain flow model, a roughness change model, a model for sheltering obstacles, a wind turbine wake model and a model for the average atmospheric stability conditions at the site. The software package further contains a Climate Analyst for creating the wind-climatological inputs, a Map Editor for creating and editing the topographical inputs, and a Turbine Editor for creating the wind turbine inputs to WAsP. The fundamentals of WAsP and the wind atlas methodology are described in the European Wind Atlas. WAsP is developed and distributed by DTU Wind and Energy Systems at the Technical University of Denmark, Denmark. Current version is WAsP 12.7.

WAsP is used for:

- Wind farm production
- Wind farm efficiency
- Micro-siting of wind turbines
- Power production calculations
- Wind resource mapping
- Wind climate estimation
- Wind atlas generation
- Wind data analysis

A special implementation of the WAsP software has been used to map the wind climate of the entire world with a resolution of 250 m, see the Global Wind Atlas.
