= Clean Energy Ministerial =

Global forum

- Clean Energy Ministerial
- Abbreviation: CEM
- Formation: 2010
- Type: Multilateral Forum
- Headquarters: Paris
- Members: 29 members: Australia Brazil Canada Chile China Denmark Finland France Germany India Indonesia Italy Japan South Korea Mexico Netherlands Poland Portugal Russia Saudi Arabia South Africa Spain Sweden United Arab Emirates United Kingdom United States European Union
- 2024 Host: Brazil
- Steering Committee: 10 members: Canada Chile China Denmark India Mexico Saudi Arabia United Kingdom United States European Union
- Key people: Jean-François Gagné, Head of Secretariat
- Website: http://www.cleanenergyministerial.org

The Clean Energy Ministerial (CEM) is a high-level global forum set up to promote policies, programmes and knowledge transfer to advance clean energy technology and encourage the transition to a global clean energy economy. According to the CEM’s institutional framework, adopted in 2016, the organization orients its actions around the Paris Agreement and the United Nations Sustainable Development Goals.

The forum encourages partnerships and collaboration between the private sector, public sector, and non-governmental organizations, and convenes individuals and energy organisations to collaborate and fast-track the implementation of clean energy technologies. Globally, CEM member governments account for 90% of clean power and 80% of clean energy investments, and large proportion of public R&D in clean energy technologies.

The forum operates through two interrelated features

- A high-level ministerial policy dialogue between energy ministers, partners and other top global stakeholders
- The CEM work programme, which consists of technical policy initiatives and campaigns

The CEM work programme spans the clean energy spectrum (power, transport, buildings, industry, and creating an enabling policy environment), with topics ranging from scaling up of electric mobility to appliance efficiency, and variable renewable integration to clean hydrogen deployment. Member participation in these initiatives and campaigns is voluntary and collaborative.

As of 2023, CEM members include Australia, Brazil, Canada, Chile, China, Denmark, European Commission, Finland, France, Germany, India, Indonesia, Italy, Japan, Korea, Mexico, Netherlands, New Zealand, Norway, Poland, Portugal, Russia, Saudi Arabia, South Africa, Spain, Sweden, United Arab Emirates, United Kingdom and United States.

CEM engagement is coordinated by an independent multilateral Secretariat housed at the International Energy Agency in Paris since 2016.

== Organisation ==
The CEM is a partnership of the world's leading economies working together to accelerate the implementation of clean energy technologies. It supports a broad range of clean energy policy and technology activities that together improve energy efficiency, expand clean energy supply, support energy systems transformation, and enhance human capacity. The CEM pairs political engagement among energy ministers at an annual Ministerial meeting with year-round technical initiatives and campaigns.

The annual Ministerial meetings are hosted by one or more CEM members, with the hosting role rotating annually among the members based on voluntary expressions of interest. Members volunteering to host a Ministerial meeting also host a Preparatory Meeting for the preceding Ministerial Meeting. The meetings are thereafter organised by the host in coordination with the CEM's Steering Committee and Secretariat in alignment with the objectives of the CEM.

Member countries propose, work on, and share leadership of CEM initiatives and campaigns that help them achieve their own national clean energy objectives. The underlying coordination support and analytical work of these initiatives and campaigns are undertaken by one or more operating agents appointed by the leading member governments shaping the work.

=== Steering Committee ===
The CEM Steering Committee provides ongoing high-level strategic guidance to all aspects of the work of the CEM guiding activities in alignment with the CEM's overall mission. Steering Committee members serve for two-year renewable terms with staggered rotation. In undertaking its functions, the Steering Committee is co-chaired by the hosts of the immediate past Ministerial and the upcoming meeting host member. They are assisted in conducting the proceedings by the Secretariat. As of 31 November 2022, the Steering Committee is composed of the United States, Chile, Canada, China, Denmark, European Commission, India (current hosts), Brazil (upcoming hosts), United Kingdom, Mexico, and Saudi Arabia.

=== CEM Secretariat ===
All CEM engagement is coordinated by an independent and multilateral secretariat. At the formation of the CEM in 2010, the Secretariat was housed within the US Department of Energy. In 2016 at the 7th Clean Energy Ministerial (CEM7) in San Francisco, CEM members agreed to launch an enhanced effort called “CEM 2.0” voting to increase the organization's effectiveness by creating an international and multilateral secretariat to support CEM activities. The Secretariat moved to the International Energy Agency in Paris in the same year. Christian Zinglersen was appointed the first Head of Secretariat in 2017. Zinglersen was replaced by Daniel Dorner in May 2020, who held the position until December 2022. The current head of secretariat is Jean-François Gagné.

== Ministerial meetings ==
The CEM ministerial policy dialogue is the only regular meeting of energy ministers focused exclusively on clean energy. The host of the Ministerial meeting changes each year among member governments.

- CEM1, 2010: United States
- CEM2, 2011: United Arab Emirates
- CEM3, 2012: United Kingdom
- CEM4, 2013: India
- CEM5, 2014: South Korea
- CEM6, 2015: Mexico
- CEM7, 2016: San Francisco, United States
- CEM8, 2017: China
- CEM9, 2018: European Commission together with Sweden, Denmark, Norway, and Finland
- CEM10, 2019: Canada
- CEM11, 2020: Saudi Arabia
- CEM12, 2021: Chile
- CEM13, 2022: Pittsburgh, United States
- CEM14, 2023: Goa, India
- CEM15, 2024: Foz do Iguaçu, Brazil

Since 2016, Mission Innovation, a technology R&D ministerial forum, is co-located with the CEM meetings.

== Initiatives of the Clean Energy Ministerial ==
CEM Initiatives are the sustained collaborative efforts established and led by CEM Members to advance clean energy policy and technology. A minimum of three members are required to participate in the work of the Initiatives may take a wide variety of forms, based on the interests of Members. While CEM initiatives are led by CEM members, participation in initiatives is open to any country. Participation across all CEM initiatives is voluntary and commitments are non-binding for participating members. Initiatives primarily target governmental participation but may include private-sector participation. In addition to the sustained, long term collaborative efforts in the form of CEM initiatives, the platform also offers a set of Campaigns which are aimed to raise the level of ambition of global deployment targets of key clean energy solutions. Campaigns are short duration, lasting 2-3 years to garner the necessary political momentum on specific topics.

While there are 29 CEM Member governments, there are currently an additional 26 other governments who participate in the various initiatives of the CEM.

The initiatives and campaigns of the CEM span a wide range of topics, ranging from power system transformations to clean fuels, such as bioenergy and hydrogen, and energy demand sectors such as industry, transport and buildings. Other enablers of clean energy transition such as policy, clean energy finance. Gender equality and issues of just transition also feature as CEM initiatives under the Empowering Society work stream.

Initiatives are led by, and participated in, by CEM member governments. Coordination of the initiatives is typically carried out by organizations working on behalf of the governments as operating agents. For example, the Industrial Deep Decarbonisation Initiative (IDDI) is coordinated by the United Nations Industrial Development Organization (UNIDO), and the secretariat is housed in UNIDO's headquarters in Vienna, Austria.

As of March 2023, there were 21 CEM initiatives and campaigns.

== Past initiatives and campaigns ==
Past initiatives include:

- Combined Heat and Power and Efficient District Heating and Cooling Working Group
- Cool Roofs and Pavements Working Group
- Sectoral Working Group
- Bioenergy Working Group
- Sustainable Development of Hydropower
