= Autonomous aircraft =

Aircraft which flies without a human pilot

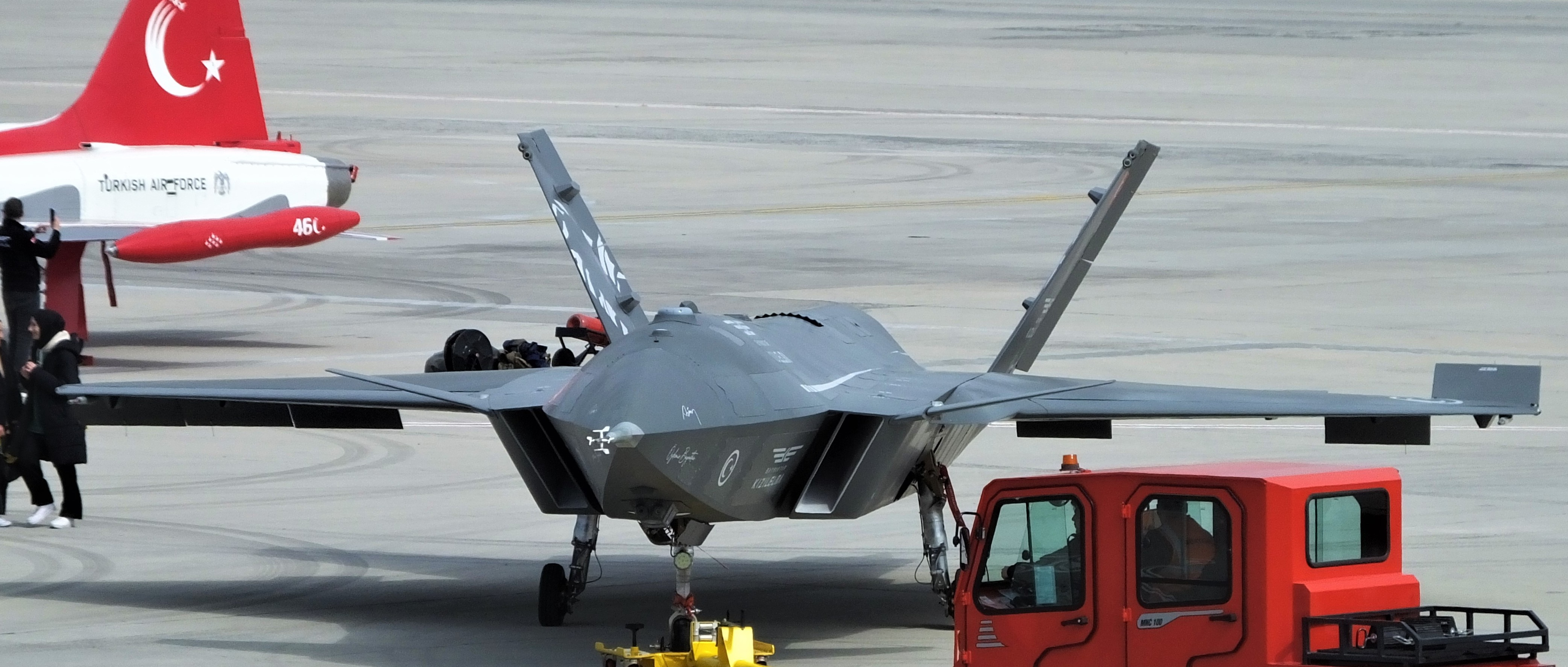
Turkish made Bayraktar Kızılelma, the world's first unmanned fighter with the full autonomous capability.

An autonomous aircraft is an aircraft which flies under the control of on-board autonomous robotic systems and needs no intervention from a human pilot or remote control. Most contemporary autonomous aircraft are unmanned aerial vehicles (drones) with pre-programmed algorithms to perform designated tasks, but advancements in artificial intelligence technologies (e.g. machine learning) mean that autonomous control systems are reaching a point where several air taxis and associated regulatory regimes are being developed.

== History ==
=== Unmanned aerial vehicles ===
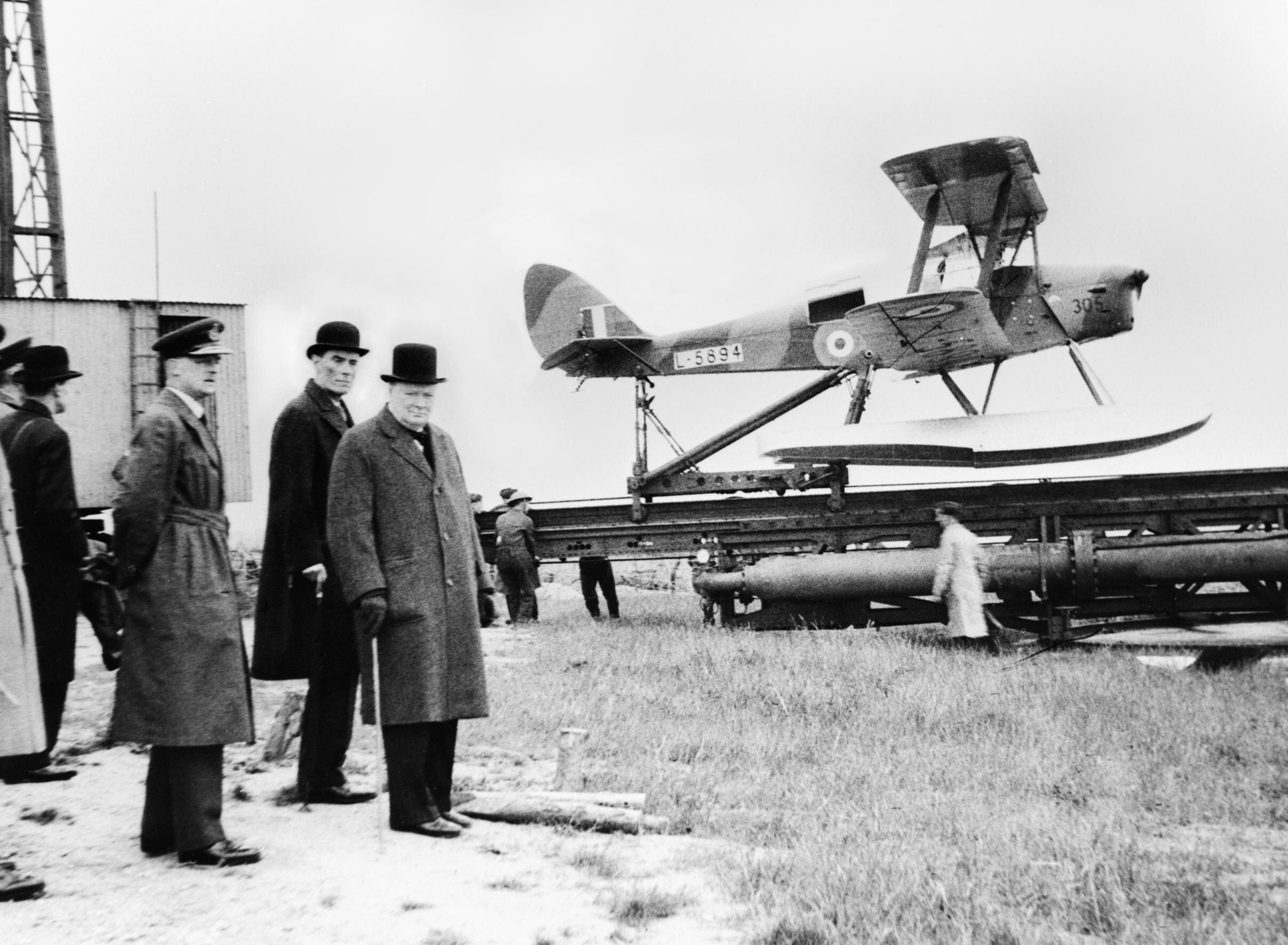
Winston Churchill and others waiting to watch the launch of a de Havilland Queen Bee target drone, 6 June 1941

The earliest recorded use of an unmanned aerial vehicle for warfighting occurred in July 1849, serving as a balloon carrier (the precursor to the aircraft carrier) Significant development of radio-controlled drones started in the early 1900s, and originally focused on providing practice targets for training military personnel. The earliest attempt at a powered UAV was A. M. Low's "Aerial Target" in 1916.

Autonomous features such as the autopilot and automated navigation were developed progressively through the twentieth century, although techniques such as terrain contour matching (TERCOM) were applied mainly to cruise missiles.

Before the introduction of the Bayraktar Kızılelma some modern drones have a high degree of autonomy, although they were not fully capable and the regulatory environment prohibits their widespread use in civil aviation. However some limited trials had been undertaken. On December 17, 2025, two Bayraktar Kızılelma performed the world's first autonomous close-formation flight by two unmanned fighter jets, using artificial intelligence. This was the first time in the history of aviation when two unmanned aerial vehicles flew in close formation on their own.

=== Passengers ===
As flight, navigation and communications systems have become more sophisticated, safely carrying passengers has emerged as a practical possibility. Autopilot systems are relieving the human pilot of progressively more duties, but the pilot currently remains necessary.

A number of air taxis are under development and larger autonomous transports are also being planned. The personal air vehicle is another class where from one to four passengers are not expected to be able to pilot the aircraft and autonomy is seen as necessary for widespread adoption.

== Control system architecture ==
The computing capability of aircraft flight and navigation systems followed the advances of computing technology, beginning with analog controls and evolving into microcontrollers, then system-on-a-chip (SOC) and single-board computers (SBC).

=== Sensors ===
Position and movement sensors give information about the aircraft state. Exteroceptive sensors deal with external information like distance measurements, while proprioceptive ones correlate internal and external states.

Degrees of freedom (DOF) refers to both the amount and quality of sensors on board: 6 DOF implies 3-axis gyroscopes and accelerometers (a typical inertial measurement unit – IMU), 9 DOF refers to an IMU plus a compass, 10 DOF adds a barometer and 11 DOF usually adds a GPS receiver.

=== Actuators ===
UAV actuators include digital electronic speed controllers (which control the RPM of the motors) linked to motors/engines and propellers, servomotors (for planes and helicopters mostly), weapons, payload actuators, LEDs and speakers.

=== Software ===
UAV software called the flight stack or autopilot. The purpose of the flight stack is to obtain data from sensors, control motors to ensure UAV stability, and facilitate ground control and mission planning communication.

UAVs are real-time systems that require rapid response to changing sensor data. As a result, UAVs rely on single-board computers for their computational needs. Examples of such single-board computers include Raspberry Pis, Beagleboards, etc. shielded with NavIO, PXFMini, etc. or designed from scratch such as NuttX, preemptive-RT Linux, Xenomai, Orocos-Robot Operating System or DDS-ROS 2.0.

Flight stack overview
Layer	Requirement	Operations	Example
Firmware	Time-critical	From machine code to processor execution, memory access	ArduCopter-v1, PX4
Middleware	Time-critical	Flight control, navigation, radio management	PX4, Cleanflight, ArduPilot
Operating system	Computer-intensive	Optical flow, obstacle avoidance, SLAM, decision-making	ROS, Nuttx, Linux distributions, Microsoft IOT

Civil-use open-source stacks include:

- ArduCopter
- CrazyFlie
- KKMultiCopter
- MultiWii
  - BaseFlight (forked from MultiWii)
    - CleanFlight (forked from BaseFlight)
      - BetaFlight (forked from CleanFlight)
      - iNav (forked from CleanFlight)
      - RaceFlight (forked from CleanFlight)
- OpenPilot
  - dRonin (forked from OpenPilot)
  - LibrePilot (forked from OpenPilot)
  - TauLabs (forked from OpenPilot)
- Paparazzi
- PX4 autopilot
  - DroneCode (Umbrella organization managing PX4 within the Linux Foundation)

Due to the open-source nature of UAV software, they can be customized to fit specific applications. For example, researchers from the Technical University of Košice have replaced the default control algorithm of the PX4 autopilot. This flexibility and collaborative effort has led to a large number of different open-source stacks, some of which are forked from others, such as CleanFlight, which is forked from BaseFlight and from which three other stacks are forked from.

=== Loop principles ===
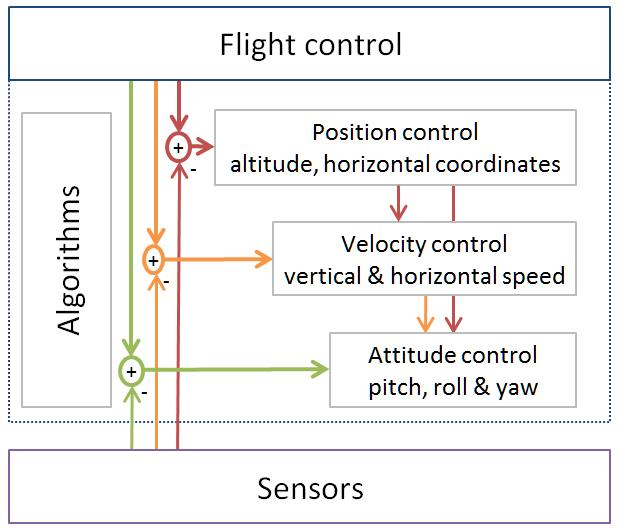
Typical flight-control loops for a multirotor

UAVs employ open-loop, closed-loop or hybrid control architectures.

- Open loop – This type provides a positive control signal (faster, slower, left, right, up, down) without incorporating feedback from sensor data.
- Closed loop – This type incorporates sensor feedback to adjust behavior (reduce speed to reflect tailwind, move to altitude 300 feet). The PID controller is common. Sometimes, feedforward is employed, transferring the need to close the loop further.

== Communications ==
Most UAVs use a radio for remote control and exchange of video and other data. Early UAVs had only narrowband uplink. Downlinks came later. These bi-directional narrowband radio links carried command and control (C&C) and telemetry data about the status of aircraft systems to the remote operator. For very long range flights, military UAVs also use satellite receivers as part of satellite navigation systems. In cases when video transmission was required, the UAVs will implement a separate analog video radio link.

In most modern autonomous applications, video transmission is required. A broadband link is used to carry all types of data on a single radio link. These broadband links can leverage quality of service techniques to optimize the C&C traffic for low latency. Usually, these broadband links carry TCP/IP traffic that can be routed over the Internet.

Communications can be established with:

- Ground control – a military ground control station (GCS). The MAVLink protocol is increasingly becoming popular to carry command and control data between the ground control and the vehicle.
- Remote network system, such as satellite duplex data links for some military powers. Downstream digital video over mobile networks has also entered consumer markets, while direct UAV control uplink over the cellular mesh and LTE have been demonstrated and are in trials.
- Another aircraft, serving as a relay or mobile control station – military manned-unmanned teaming (MUM-T).

As mobile networks have increased in performance and reliability over the years, drones have begun to use mobile networks for communication. Mobile networks can be used for drone tracking, remote piloting, over the air updates, and cloud computing.

Modern networking standards have explicitly considered autonomous aircraft and therefore include optimizations. The 5G standard has mandated reduced user plane latency to 1ms while using ultra-reliable and low-latency communications.

== Autonomy ==
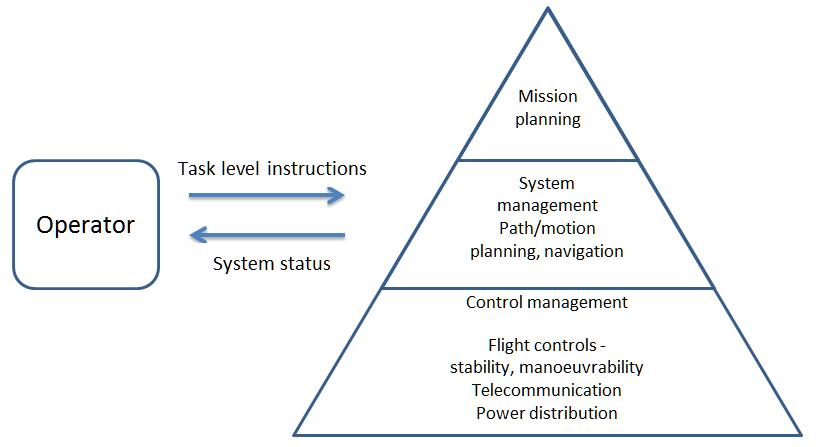
Autonomous control basics

Basic autonomy comes from proprioceptive sensors. Advanced autonomy calls for situational awareness, knowledge about the environment surrounding the aircraft from exteroceptive sensors: sensor fusion integrates information from multiple sensors.

Civil aviation regulators and standards bodies have published high-level roadmaps and discussion papers focused on assurance, safety and governance of AI-enabled systems in aviation, particularly as autonomy increases in operations and decision support.

=== Basic principles ===
One way to achieve autonomous control employs multiple control-loop layers, as in hierarchical control systems. As of 2016 the low-layer loops (i.e. for flight control) tick as fast as 32,000 times per second, while higher-level loops may cycle once per second. The principle is to decompose the aircraft's behavior into manageable "chunks", or states, with known transitions. Hierarchical control system types range from simple scripts to finite state machines, behavior trees and hierarchical task planners. The most common control mechanism used in these layers is the PID controller which can be used to achieve hover for a quadcopter by using data from the IMU to calculate precise inputs for the electronic speed controllers and motors.

Examples of mid-layer algorithms:

- Path planning: determining an optimal path for vehicle to follow while meeting mission objectives and constraints, such as obstacles or fuel requirements
- Trajectory generation (motion planning): determining control maneuvers to take in order to follow a given path or to go from one location to another
- Trajectory regulation: constraining a vehicle within some tolerance to a trajectory

Evolved UAV hierarchical task planners use methods like state tree searches or genetic algorithms.

=== Autonomy features ===
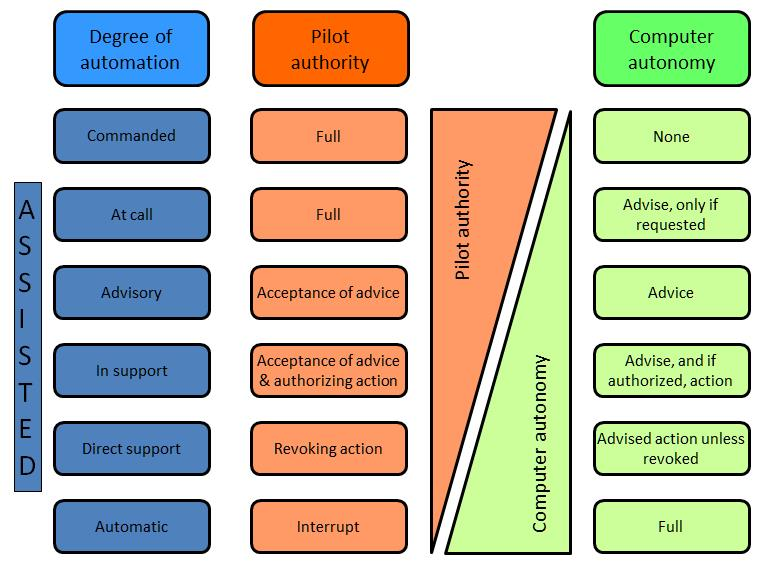
UAV's degrees of autonomy

UAV manufacturers often build in specific autonomous operations, such as:

- Self-level: attitude stabilization on the pitch and roll axes.
- Altitude hold: The aircraft maintains its altitude using barometric pressure and/or GPS data.
- Hover/position hold: Keep level pitch and roll, stable yaw heading and altitude while maintaining position using GNSS or inertial sensors.
- Headless mode: Pitch control relative to the position of the pilot rather than relative to the vehicle's axes.
- Care-free: automatic roll and yaw control while moving horizontally
- Take-off and landing (using a variety of aircraft or ground-based sensors and systems; see also:Autoland)
- Failsafe: automatic landing or return-to-home upon loss of control signal
- Return-to-home: Fly back to the point of takeoff (often gaining altitude first to avoid possible intervening obstructions such as trees or buildings).
- Follow-me: Maintain relative position to a moving pilot or other object using GNSS, image recognition or homing beacon.
- GPS waypoint navigation: Using GNSS to navigate to an intermediate location on a travel path.
- Orbit around an object: Similar to Follow-me but continuously circle a target.
- Pre-programmed aerobatics (such as rolls and loops).

=== Functions ===
Full autonomy is available for specific tasks, such as airborne refueling or ground-based battery switching; but higher-level tasks call for greater computing, sensing and actuating capabilities. One approach to quantifying autonomous capabilities is based on OODA terminology, as suggested by a 2002 US Air Force Research Laboratory, and used in the table below:

United States Autonomous control levels chart
Level	Level descriptor	Observe	Orient	Decide	Act
		Perception/Situational awareness	Analysis/Coordination	Decision making	Capability
10	Fully Autonomous	Cognizant of all within battlespace	Coordinates as necessary	Capable of total independence	Requires little guidance to do job
9	Battlespace Swarm Cognizance	Battlespace inference – Intent of self and others (allied and foes). Complex/Intense environment – on-board tracking	Strategic group goals assigned Enemy strategy inferred	Distributed tactical group planning Individual determination of tactical goal Individual task planning/execution Choose tactical targets	Group accomplishment of strategic goal with no supervisory assistance
8	Battlespace Cognizance	Proximity inference – Intent of self and others (allied and foes) Reduces dependence upon off-board data	Strategic group goals assigned Enemy tactics inferred ATR	Coordinated tactical group planning Individual task planning/execution Choose target of opportunity	Group accomplishment of strategic goal with minimal supervisory assistance (example: go SCUD hunting)
7	Battlespace Knowledge	Short track awareness – History and predictive battlespace Data in limited range, timeframe and numbers Limited inference supplemented by off-board data	Tactical group goals assigned Enemy trajectory estimated	Individual task planning/execution to meet goals	Group accomplishment of tactical goals with minimal supervisory assistance
6	Real Time Multi-Vehicle Cooperation	Ranged awareness – on-board sensing for long range, supplemented by off-board data	Tactical group goals assigned Enemy trajectory sensed/estimated	Coordinated trajectory planning and execution to meet goals – group optimization	Group accomplishment of tactical goals with minimal supervisory assistance Possible: close air space separation (+/-100yds) for AAR, formation in non-threat conditions
5	Real Time Multi-Vehicle Coordination	Sensed awareness – Local sensors to detect others, Fused with off-board data	Tactical group plan assigned RT Health Diagnosis Ability to compensate for most failures and flight conditions; Ability to predict onset of failures (e.g. Prognostic Health Mgmt) Group diagnosis and resource management	On-board trajectory replanning – optimizes for current and predictive conditions Collision avoidance	Self accomplishment of tactical plan as externally assigned Medium vehicle airspace separation (hundreds of yds)
4	Fault/Event Adaptative Vehicle	Deliberate awareness – allies communicate data	Tactical group plan assigned Assigned Rules of Engagement RT Health Diagnosis; Ability to compensate for most failures and flight conditions – inner loop changes reflected in outer loop performance	On-board trajectory replanning – event driven Self resource management Deconfliction	Self accomplishment of tactical plan as externally assigned Medium vehicle airspace separation (hundreds of yds)
3	Robust Response to Real Time Faults/Events	Health/status history & models	Tactical group plan assigned RT Health Diagnosis (What is the extent of the problems?) Ability to compensate for most failures and flight conditions (i.e. adaptative inner loop control)	Evaluate status vs required mission capabilities Abort/RTB is insufficient	Self accomplishment of tactical plan as externally assigned
2	Changeable mission	Health/status sensors	RT Health diagnosis (Do I have problems?) Off-board replan (as required)	Execute preprogrammed or uploaded plans in response to mission and health conditions	Self accomplishment of tactical plan as externally assigned
1	Execute Preplanned Mission	Preloaded mission data Flight Control and Navigation Sensing	Pre/Post flight BIT Report status	Preprogrammed mission and abort plans	Wide airspace separation requirements (miles)
0	Remotely Piloted Vehicle	Flight Control (attitude, rates) sensing Nose camera	Telemetered data Remote pilot commands	N/A	Control by remote pilot

Medium levels of autonomy, such as reactive autonomy and high levels using cognitive autonomy, have already been achieved to some extent and are very active research fields.

=== Reactive autonomy ===
Reactive autonomy, such as collective flight, real-time collision avoidance, wall following and corridor centring, relies on telecommunication and situational awareness provided by range sensors: optic flow, lidars (light radars), radars, sonars.

Most range sensors analyze electromagnetic radiation, reflected off the environment and coming to the sensor. The cameras (for visual flow) act as simple receivers. Lidars, radars and sonars (with sound mechanical waves) emit and receive waves, measuring the round-trip transit time. UAV cameras do not require emitting power, reducing total consumption.

Radars and sonars are mostly used for military applications.

Reactive autonomy has in some forms already reached consumer markets: it may be widely available in less than a decade.

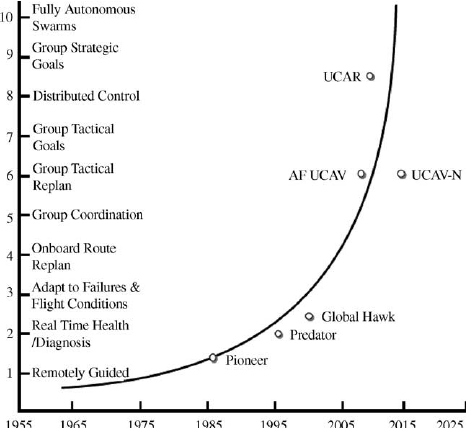
Cutting-edge (2013) autonomous levels for existing systems

=== Simultaneous localization and mapping ===
SLAM combines odometry and external data to represent the world and the position of the UAV in it in three dimensions. High-altitude outdoor navigation does not require large vertical fields-of-view and can rely on GPS coordinates (which makes it simple mapping rather than SLAM).

Two related research fields are photogrammetry and LIDAR, especially in low-altitude and indoor 3D environments.

- Indoor photogrammetric and stereophotogrammetric SLAM has been demonstrated with quadcopters.
- Lidar platforms with heavy, costly and gimbaled traditional laser platforms are proven. Research attempts to address production cost, 2D to 3D expansion, power-to-range ratio, weight and dimensions. LED range-finding applications are commercialized for low-distance sensing capabilities. Research investigates hybridization between light emission and computing power: phased array spatial light modulators, and frequency-modulated-continuous-wave (FMCW) MEMS-tunable vertical-cavity surface-emitting lasers (VCSELs).

=== Swarming ===
Robot swarming refers to networks of agents able to dynamically reconfigure as elements leave or enter the network. They provide greater flexibility than multi-agent cooperation. Swarming may open the path to data fusion. Some bio-inspired flight swarms use steering behaviors and flocking.

== Future military potential ==
In the military sector, American Predators and Reapers are made for counterterrorism operations and in war zones in which the enemy lacks sufficient firepower to shoot them down. They are not designed to withstand antiaircraft defenses or air-to-air combat. In September 2013, the chief of the US Air Combat Command stated that current UAVs were "useless in a contested environment" unless crewed aircraft were there to protect them. A 2012 Congressional Research Service (CRS) report speculated that in the future, UAVs may be able to perform tasks beyond intelligence, surveillance, reconnaissance and strikes; the CRS report listed air-to-air combat ("a more difficult future task") as possible future undertakings. The Department of Defense's Unmanned Systems Integrated Roadmap FY2013-2038 foresees a more important place for UAVs in combat. Issues include extended capabilities, human-UAV interaction, managing increased information flux, increased autonomy and developing UAV-specific munitions. DARPA's project of systems of systems, or General Atomics work may augur future warfare scenarios, the latter disclosing Avenger swarms equipped with High Energy Liquid Laser Area Defense System (HELLADS).

At the ILA Berlin Air Show 2026, Airbus and Boeing, each unveiled an autonomous aircraft.

Martin Karkour, Chief Revenue Officer at Quantum Systems spoke on the uncrewed 'U145', introduced by Airbus Helicopters, stating:

"This cooperation demonstrates how Europe's defense industry can combine complementary strengths to address emerging operational challenges. Together, Airbus and Quantum Systems are advancing the integration of crewed and uncrewed capabilities to build a more resilient and effective defense ecosystem. As a deep-tech prime for the unmanned era, our ambition is to support armed forces in gaining a decisive technological advantage against increasingly sophisticated airborne threats. Current developments show that aerial systems need answers to drone threats."

A variant of their MQ-28 Ghost Bat drone was introduced by Boeing, the MQ-28 Global Program Director, Glen Ferguson noting:

"(...) additional capacity gives operators freedom to balance payload and endurance to configure for the mission at hand, whether that means carrying extra fuel for longer-range operations, increasing weapons carriage, or any combination of both.”

=== Cognitive radio ===
Cognitive radio technology may have UAV applications.

=== Learning capabilities ===
UAVs may exploit distributed neural networks.

== See also ==
- International Aerial Robotics Competition
- Satellite Sentinel Project
- Tactical Control System
- Xwing (aviation)
- Single pilot operations
- Automated flight attending
