= Jani Hirvinen =

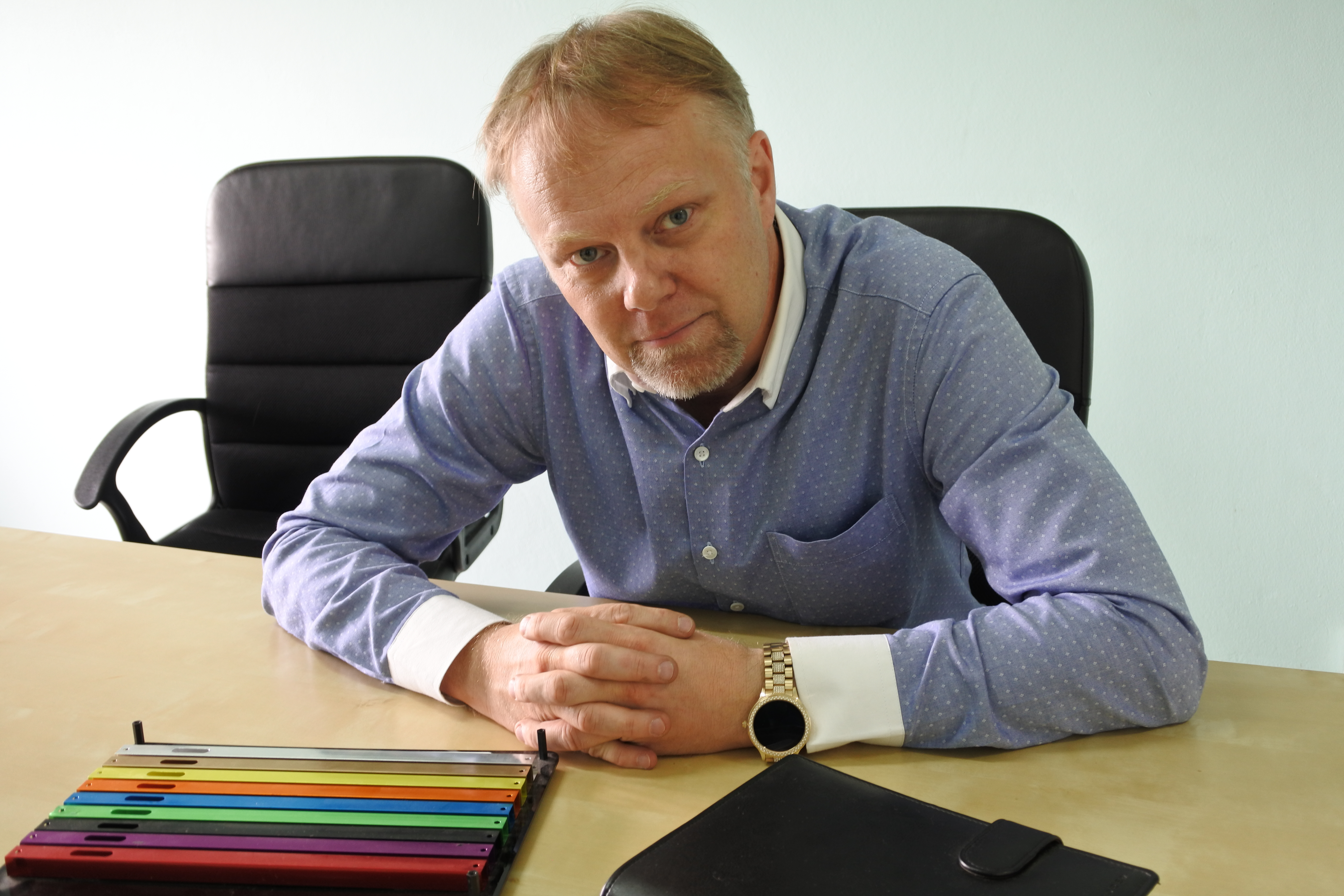
- Hirvinen at his office in Bangkok.
- Born: November 25, 1969 (age 56); Helsinki, Finland
- Other name: Jani-Petri Kalervo Hirvinen
- Occupations: CEO, jnMechanics, TH, Sky Kingdom Technology, HK
- Known for: Entrepreneurship, Drones, Networks, Aviation, Electronics, ArduCopter

Jani Hirvinen (born in 1969 in Helsinki, Finland) is one of the early Finnish IT-technology pioneers. Hirvinen is also one of the first ones developing small private sector professional level UAVs (unmanned aerial vehicles). He is among the top developers of the ArduCopter platform that - together with the included autopilot - changed the way drones are being flown all over the world. He is also the co-founder of famous international unmanned institutions ArduPilot, DIYDrones and DroneCode.

On top of being a developer, Hirvinen is also a visionary. According to him, we are facing Planet 5.0, an era transforming us to work and live differently in terms of logistics, transportation and human interaction. This will also open doors for us to explore planets far beyond ours.

== Youth ==
=== Early life ===
Hirvinen was born to a family of aviation as his father was a long term aviator and flight instructor in Finland. Her mother had acquired pilot's license while being pregnant with her son. Throughout he has been keen on aviation and the technologies behind it. In his early age, he was able to access new technologies around the world due to the connections of his parents. He was starting electronics at the age of four years and computers at age of eight years.

=== 1980s ===
Hirvinen received his first Sinclair ZX80 in 1980 just a few weeks after it was released in the UK. The following year Hirvinen started to work with new released Sinclair ZX81 and became a member of the international Sinclair Club.

After graduating from High School Hirvinen became one of the youngest and earliest persons in Finland to get in touch with SMD technologies and also a programmer for SMD Assembly machine. He started to work with Universal Omni-place 4621A machines at a company called Point Production Ltd in Hyvinkää, Finland. One highlight of his early "SMD era" was to introduce SMD technologies, and he was responsible for creating first SMD assemblies for the Finnish Army in 1987.

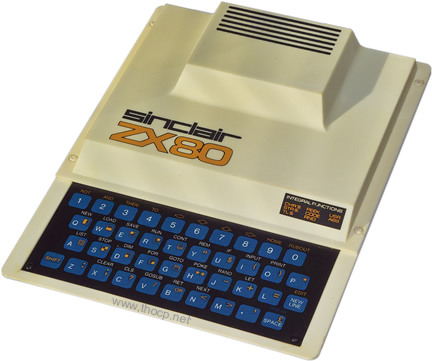
Sinclair ZX80.

Already in the early 1980s, Hirvinen was creating FidoNet (a worldwide computer network that is used for communication between bulletin board systems) and SiGNET bulletin board system (BBS) networks.

== Later career ==
=== 1990s ===
Hirvinen started his first ISP in 1994 called as SGIC Communications Oy in Tampere, Finland. Two year later they acquired a majority from VIP Tietoverkot Oy and changed the corporation's name to VIP Networks Oy. During the early dates of the known internet age, he has one of the first ones to create web sites and web hosting systems in Finland.

=== Pioneering the field of drones ===
In 2009, Hirvinen started to work again on electronics development and aviation industry. From AeroQuad project and created ArduCopter team. He became a leader of ArduCopter development team and created the first ArduCopter that is now base system for the worlds No.1 multicopter platform. In late 2010 Hirvinen released that hit markets really hard and introduced many new techniques that are now in use on most multicopter airframes. Soon after the initial release of ArduCopter, jDrones and 3DRobotics companies were created to serve ever growing need of creating personal drones for the masses.

=== Transformation to technopreneur ===
Hirvinen describes himself being a technopreneur. He specializes on electronics, robotics, sensor networks, telemetry systems, IoT, Drones (air, land, sea). He is also doing custom-made R&D for electronics, frames (air, sea land), softwares, and OEM services. He has been involved in the manufacturing of unmanned and full-size manned aircraft for more than 40 years. For more than three decades, he has worked with a variety of IT platforms to handle complex electronics and advanced robotics. This had made him a well-known name in the UV field.

Hirvinen is currently the CEO of the Thai UAV Industry Company, the Vice President of the World Drone Federation, and a member of the Expert Committee of the Shenzhen UAV Industry Association. He owns brands like jDrones, jD-UAS, and jD-Tactical.

== Visions ==
=== Influencers ===
Scientists like Albert Einstein, Isaac Newton, and a Swiss mathematician and physicist Daniel Bernoulli have greatly inspired Hirvinen. Stephen Hawking's world views have also always impressed him. For Hirvinen, Industrial 4.0 is already an old concept. He sees current entrepreneurs like Elon Musk, who is envisioning new innovative transportation systems like Hyperloop, SpaceX, and Tesla, being in the front row of the development of unmanned systems.

=== Planet 5.0 ===
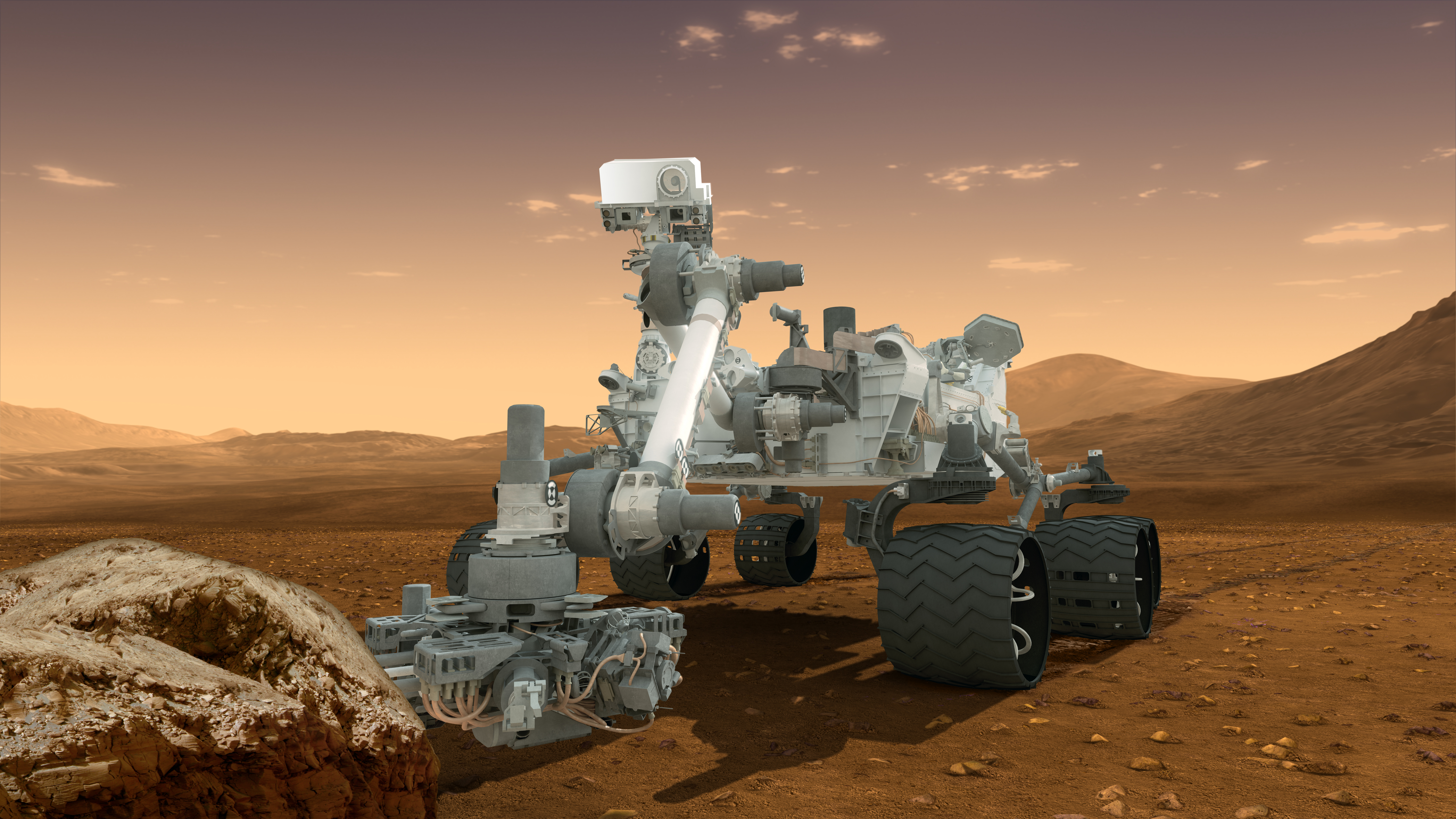
According to Hirvinen, UVs will lead us beyond Earth.

Hirvinen sees unmanned industry already getting to the mainstream. He calls this new era Planet 5.0.

Unmanned technology seems to already be everywhere. Tesla Roadster has become an artificial satellite of the Sun, human-sized robots achieve difficult parkour moves, and we have witnessed the beginning of unmanned technology on retail level. First fully automated hamburger shops and unmanned grocery stores have already been launched in several countries.

According to Hirvinen, e-commerce is becoming more and more popular. It has put the delivery systems under new type of pressure, because humans cannot handle fast and economically efficient volumes anymore.

To cope with the new challenges, unmanned logistics centers are becoming popular, and unmanned “postal robots” are helping sort out huge amounts of packets daily.

Hirvinen predicts that because of all the new technology, we will soon be working and living differently in terms of logistics, transportation, and human interaction. This era will eventually lead us far beyond our current planet.

One big challenge for us to overcome is how to improve the battery technology, which limits operational distances. But also this is only a temporary challenge that Hirvinen believes will eventually be resolved.

A big transformation has already started, especially in Asia. Many of the Asian countries can adapt new technologies a lot faster than most of the western countries.

Shenzhen is a good example of this. 25 years ago it was a tiny fishing village. Now, this city of over 10 million people is the leader in electronics, robotics and unmanned vehicles.

== jDrones ==
Hirvinen is the founder and CEO of jDrones. It was founded in 2010 with a dream to change the world of unmanned aerial vehicles (UAV). jDrones is an R&D company, and it creates and designs small autonomous UV devices that operate on the ground and in the air.

Hirvinen's team released the ArduCopter platform in August 2010. It was the first multicopter that was truly created for the private sector. Some of the first ArduCopters were ordered by NASA, and ArduCopter was soon made world famous by companies such as 3D Robotics.

Soon after this, jDrones launched also MinimOSD. It is an on-screen display (OSD) system which makes it possible to fly a drone with flight data instruments visible on the screen. MinimOSD is now the de facto OSD system for millions of drone operators around the world.

jDrones is also a founding member of the Dronecode Project that is hosted under the Linux Foundation and serves as the vendor-neutral home for PX4, MAVLink, QGroundControl, and the MAVSDK. Dronecode's primary purpose and mission is to encourage the development of open source consumer and commercial unmanned aerial vehicle software by building and supporting a community of developers and providing them the resources and tools to help them innovate.

Currently, jDrones has customers in about 65 countries. It is also a premier distributor for several universities, space agencies and governments.

jDrones is located in Bangkok's Prawet District.

jDrones is headquartered in Bangkok's Prawet District, where it has its R&D, manufacturing, and testing facilities for air frame design and mechanical engineering, electronics and flight control systems engineering, generic structural components manufacturing, composites manufacturing, and electronics manufacturing. It also has an electronics test lab, and an RF test lab.

On top of its own ArduCopter and drone parts, jDrones also distributes and premier brands like DIY Drones (ArduPilot modules and accessories), SparkFUN (modules and accessories), and MaxBotix (ultrasonar modules).

== Awards ==
=== Global UAV Award ===
In 2017, Hirvinen received the Global UAV Award in recognition of the outstanding contributions to the Global UAV Industry in the past few years. The award was given at the Drone World Congress.

The other winners were Tom Verbruggen, CEO of IDRONECT, professor Mr. Lan Yubin (China), Brian Wynne, President and CEO of AUVSI, and Paul Xu, Vice President of DJI from China.

== Key events ==
=== First ArduPilot UAV Developer Conference ===
The first UAV developer conference was organized in Xiamen on 22 October 2017. In the event, Ardupilot community's co-founder Jani Hirvinen and other core members shared prospects of the drone industry and shared views of the development of the Ardupilot community itself. Hirvinen also gave a lecture on the ArduPilot project and the unmanned revolution.

=== The 3rd Annual UAV Conference 2018 ===
The 3rd Annual UAV Conference was held on 6 January 2018, at Shenzhen Langham Hotel. The hosts were Shenzhen UAV Industry Association, China UAV Industry Alliance, China UAV Racing Alliance, and Shenzhen Rainbow Eagle UAV Research Institute.

In the forum organized during the conference, the cooperation signing ceremony between Shenzhen UAV Industry Association and Shenzhen Vanke Industrial Real Estate Operation Management Co., Ltd., Wing Hang Dongsheng Dongguan Aviation Industry Group Co., Ltd. and International Unmanned System Open Source Developer Organization was also held. President, Wang Jun, deputy general manager of Vanke Real Estate, Chairman of the company, Mr. Li Xuhong, and Mr. Jani Hirvinen attended the signing ceremony.

In addition, the forum also announced five group awards - 2017 China's top 10 UAV innovation companies, 2017 advanced member units, 2017 China UAV excellent service providers, 2017 China UAV excellent industry media and one Individual Award - the 2017 Drone Industry Cooperation Award.

The appointment ceremony for the newly added expert members of the Shenzhen UAV Industry Association in 2017 was also carried out. Xue Yonggang, Guo Wei, Jia Hengdan, and Jani Hirvinen were hired as members of the expert committee.

=== The 2nd Drone World Congress 2018 ===
The 2nd Drone World Congress was held 22–24 June 2018, at the Shenzhen Convention & Exhibition Center. Among other activities, the event consisted of a themed conference (Power of the Age), 18 forums, 15,000 square meters of international exhibitions, and a global drone contribution awards ceremony. World's top UAV specialists attended the 3-day congress, including Jani Hirvinen.

=== The 2nd Global Unmanned System Conference ===
The Second Global Unmanned System Conference was held 4–5 November 2018. The venue for the event was Zhuhai's International Convention & Exhibition Center. The organizers were the China UAV Industry Alliance, the Guangdong Academy of Sciences and the Zhuhai UAV Association.

With the theme of “No Man System, Wisdom Drives the Future”, more than 40 heavyweight speakers, including well-known academicians, industry elites and entrepreneurs, were invited. More than 500 guests attended the event.

Hirvinen was one of the keynote speakers of the event. The theme of his presentation was the development of open source globalization. The ArduPilot community that Hirvinen has been a part of from the beginning is a non-profit, open source drone community where drone developers from around the world can share their research in the community with the goal of providing users with a reliable and open technology.

=== 2018 Liyang International UAV Development Forum ===
On December 27–28, the "2018 Liyangyang International UAV Development Forum and the 4th SZUIA Annual Meeting" was held at the International Conference Center, Fuyang City.

The meeting was hosted by Changzhou Municipal People's Government, National UAV Association Cooperation and Mutual Aid Alliance, World UAV Federation, China Civil Aviation Emergency Rescue Alliance, Liyang Municipal People's Government, Shenzhen UAV Industry Association. More than 400 industry experts from more than 20 countries and regions, as well as relevant leaders, experts, entrepreneurs, and media, were invited to discuss the development of the industry.

The forum saw also Hirvinen give a keynote speech on UVs and the development of open source globalization.

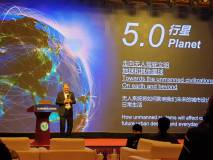
Hirvinen at Langfang in May 2019.

=== Langfang International UAV Development Forum 2019 ===
The Langfang International UAV Development Forum 2019 was held on 18–21 May. Its main theme was "New Industry, New Market, New Kinetic Energy", consisting of a forum and an exhibition. The event was hosted by Shenzhen UAV Industry Association and Langfang International Exhibition Group Co., Ltd at the Arcadia International Hotel.

In the event, leaders, experts, and entrepreneurs from more than 10 countries and regions gathered together to discuss how UAVs can nurture new industries and open up new markets in the era of artificial intelligence, and to inspire new kind of kinetic energy to promote the healthy and orderly development of the global drone industry.

In the forum, one of the keynote speakers was Jani Hirvinen, who gave an update on various developments and trends in the UAV industry. He also focused on artificial intelligence and big data shaping the industry.

=== The 3rd Drone World Congress 2019 ===
The Third Drone World Congress 2019 was held 20–22 June at the Shenzhen Convention & Exhibition Center. It was hosted by the China Information Technology Industry Federation, People's Government of Nanshan District, Government Procurement Center, Ministry of Industry and Information Technology, Research Center of UAV Application and Control, Chinese Academy of Sciences, Shenzhen Municipality and Shenzhen UAV Industry Association.

The organizing committee had invited internationally recognized UAV experts and scholars from the United States, Britain, the European Union, Canada, Australia, Brazil, Russia, Japan, Korea and Israel, along with 100 other countries and regions. Approximately 3000 UAV industry organizations, global experts, entrepreneurs, well-known advisory bodies and financial institutions were presented in this major annual UV event. The main theme of this conference was "Technology makes life better."

Coinciding with the world congress, the International Unmanned Systems Open Source Developers Conference focused on issues like non-GPS navigation, object avoidance, UAVCAN hardware system, how to build industrial solutions with drones, airborne LUA script, TECS debugging, new challenges and opportunities in drone group control and intranet, on how to apply Ardupilot to a new field - ChibiOS/HWDEF, on how to use lidar on drones, the application and future of cloud drones, new multi-rotor navigation controller based on S-curve, and to creating an open software and hardware platform, and an ecosystem suitable for different industries (UAV + load). Hirvinen was one of the keynote speakers of this event.

=== China (Huizhou) International UAV Application Development Forum ===
Organized on 23 June 2019, the first China (Huizhou) International UAV Application Development Forum was held in Huizhou, focusing on the theme “Determining Vision and Technology to Create the Future.”

The forum invited 16 countries (regions) including China, the United States, Japan, Australia. During the event, more than 50 experts and professors in the field of drones, international drone associations, and relevant leaders of the drone industry gave speeches on relevant topics to jointly explore the future innovation and development of the drone industry. Hirvinen was one of the keynote speakers of this forum.

During the event, Hirvinen was also interviewed by Nanfang Daily. In it, Hirvinen summarized China's role in the development of new UV and drone technology: "China's drone industry is developing very rapidly, especially in the hardware manufacturing and application fields, but there is still much room for improvement in drone software. As far as I know, some of the drone manufacturers in China are currently using the mature open source system in the world."

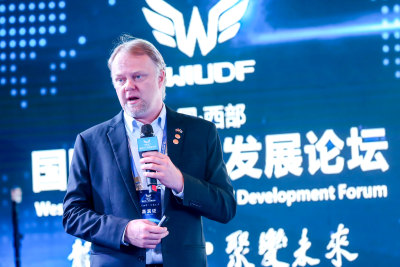
Hirvinen giving a keynote speech in Chongqing.

=== The 2019 Western China International Drone Development Forum ===
On June 27–28, the 2019 Western China International Drone Development Forum was hosted by the Chongqing UAV Industry Association at the Shangbang International Hotel in Chongqing. The forum gave birth also to the Chongqing UAV Industry Association. Hirvinen was one of the event's keynote speakers.

=== Golog First International Plateau Drone Culture Conference ===
The first international high-altitude drone culture forum of Guoluo (Golog) was held on 5 August 2019. There organizers of this unique conference and forum were the Party Golog Prefecture Committee, and the Qinghai Province Sports Bureau.

Jani Hirvinen was invited as one of the key guests to the event.

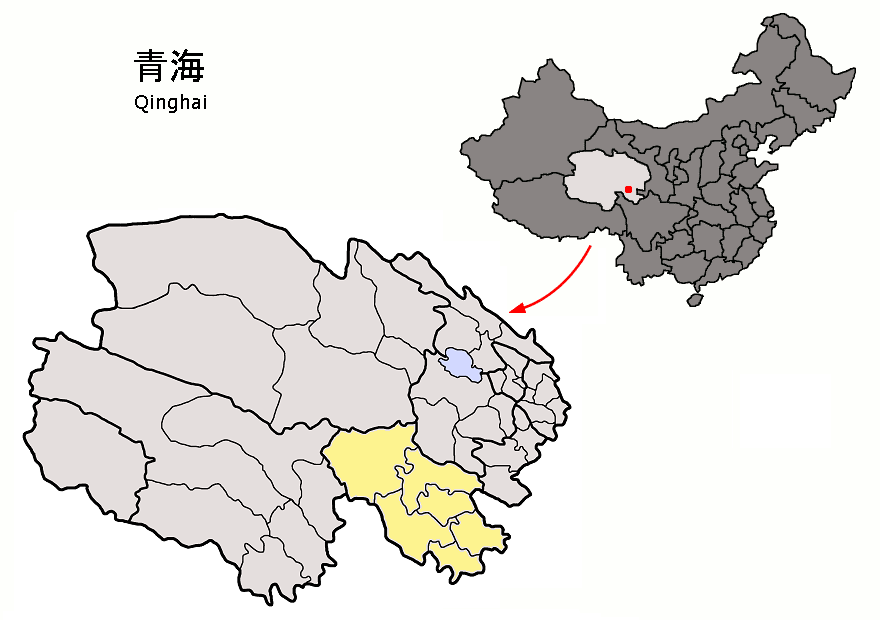
Golog Prefecture in China.

=== 2019 International Drone Development Summit ===
The 2019 International Drone Development Summit, one of the special events of the 2019 World Internet of Things Expo, was held in China's Wuxi on 6 September 2019. Hirvinen was one of the foreign UV experts that were invited to the event.

== Private life ==
In 2005, Hirvinen moved to Thailand, where he still has his home and drone assembly line in Bangkok's Prawet district. Hirvinen is married to a Thai and has a daughter and son. His hobbies include R/C heli flying, electronics occasional paragliding, sailplane flying and ice skating.
