= Auterion =

Swiss-American uncrewed vehicle software company

- Type: Private
- Industry: Technology
- Founded: 2017 (9 years ago) in Zurich, Switzerland
- Founders: Lorenz Meier; Kevin Sartori
- Headquarters: Arlington, Virginia, U.S.
- Website: auterion.com

Auterion is a multi-national software company that develops a common operating system and software apps for autonomous systems, primarily focusing on weaponized drones and robotic vehicles for the enterprise and defense sectors. Auterion's core product, AuterionOS, is a commercial distribution of the widely used open-source PX4 autopilot software. The company is headquartered in Arlington, Virginia. It operates a European software development hub in Munich, Germany, and maintains its civil engineering operations in Zurich, Switzerland, where it was originally founded in 2017.

The company's strategy is centered on creating an open ecosystem, analogous to Android for smartphones, which allows various hardware components and software applications to interoperate seamlessly. This approach contrasts with the proprietary, closed systems common in the drone industry. By providing a standardized software backbone, Auterion enables manufacturers to accelerate development and allows end-users to manage diverse fleets of vehicles from multiple vendors through a unified interface.

The company develops and deploys AI-powered capabilities, such as autonomous swarming and terminal guidance, which are designed to function in contested environments where GPS and communications are denied. Its engagement with the U.S. Department of Defense and allied nations has become a primary driver of its growth, positioning it as a key software provider for modern, software-defined weapon systems.

== History ==
- 2017: Auterion was founded in November by Dr. Lorenz Meier and Kevin Sartori in Zurich, Switzerland. The company was created to commercialize PX4, the widely adopted open-source autopilot software that originated from Dr. Meier's academic work at ETH Zurich.
- 2018: The company secured a $10 million seed funding round in September, providing the initial capital to build out its commercial offerings based on the open-source stack.
- 2020: The United States Government, through the Defense Innovation Unit (DIU), made the decision to standardize on the PX4 autopilot and MAVLink communication protocol for its Blue sUAS architecture. Auterion was contracted to provide government-approved software distributions for this program, solidifying its role within the U.S. defense ecosystem.
- 2024: In June, Auterion introduced Skynode S, an all-in-one flight controller and mission computer positioned for kinetic military use, designed to be National Defense Authorization Act (NDAA) compliant. On August 21, the company was selected by DIU as one of three firms to develop solutions for sUAS control in electromagnetically contested environments. In the context of its work with the US Government and citing a "better regulatory environment in the United States", Auterion relocated its headquarters to Arlington, Virginia.
- 2025: The company experienced significant growth and engagement with the defense sector. In March, it was selected by the DIU for Project Artemis, an initiative to prototype long-range, kamikaze drones. Auterion announced the successful completion of that program in October, with its long‑range one‑way deep‑strike drone passing operational testing in Ukraine. In June, Auterion signed a Memorandum of Understanding (MoU) with National Chung-Shan Institute of Science and Technology (NCSIST) to integrate its drone swarming technology. Later that month Auterion signed a deal with Taiwanese drone manufacturer Thunder Tiger to embed advanced AI into its entire range of unmanned vehicles and buy Auterion software licences for around 25,000 drones. In July, Auterion was awarded a 50 million USD contract by the U.S. Department of War to provide 33,000 artificial intelligence-based drone guidance kits to Ukraine for use in locally manufactured drones. In September, Auterion introduced Nemyx, a cross‑platform swarm strike engine that powers drones from different manufacturers running AuterionOS and Skynode S to operate as a single AI‑coordinated combat swarm, enabling simultaneous engagement of multiple targets and scaling from small units to large formations. That same month, the company announced a $130 million Series B funding round led by Bessemer Venture Partners, which valued the company at "north of $600 million".

== Founder ==
Auterion's technology and strategic direction are deeply connected to the work of its co-founder, Dr. Lorenz Meier. While co-founded with Kevin Sartori, who left the company in 2021, Dr. Meier's technical contributions form the core of the Auterions's intellectual property and extend beyond the company, as he is the creator of widely used open-source software and hardware standards in the drone industry.

Dr. Meier's key contributions to the open-source drone community include:

- PX4 Autopilot: An open-source flight control software for drones and other uncrewed vehicles. Originating from his academic research, PX4 provides the core guidance, navigation, and control algorithms used by a vast number of commercial and custom-built drones worldwide.
- MAVLink: The Micro Air Vehicle Communication Protocol, a lightweight and efficient messaging protocol designed for communication between a drone, its ground control station, and its onboard components.
- QGroundControl: A cross-platform and open-source ground control station (GCS) application for MAVLink-enabled vehicles, allowing users to plan missions and operate drones from various devices.
- Pixhawk: An open hardware standard that defines specifications for flight controller hardware (autopilots), creating an interoperable standard for manufacturers.

== Technology and Products ==
Auterion's core technological strategy is to provide a unified, hardware-agnostic software platform that functions as a common operating system for autonomous systems. This platform is designed to support vehicles across air, land, and sea domains, enabling an open ecosystem where hardware from different manufacturers can operate together seamlessly. The product stack is layered, consisting of an onboard operating system, reference hardware, and a suite of software applications for mission control and fleet management.

=== AuterionOS: The Operating System ===
AuterionOS is the company's central product, a commercial and hardened distribution of the open-source PX4 flight control software created by Auterion's founder. It is packaged as a complete, vendor-independent operating system for robotic systems. AuterionOS serves as the software backbone that runs on a vehicle's onboard computer, managing all core functions from flight control to mission execution. The common platform enables an ecosystem of compatible vehicles, payloads (such as cameras and sensors), and third-party software applications, allowing for modularity and interoperability.

=== Skynode: Onboard Hardware ===
Skynode is Auterion’s group of hardware designed to run AuterionOS. These units combine a flight controller for real-time operations with an onboard mission computer for handling high-level tasks such as AI, computer vision, and advanced communications. Skynode acts as an all-in-one avionics module that manufacturers can integrate into their vehicle designs.

| Model | Target Use | Key Features | Status |
|---|---|---|---|
| Skynode S | Small integrated systems, FPV drones, Fixed Wing | Lightweight, low-cost. 2.3 TOPS NPU, 4GB RAM. | Available |
| Skynode X | Medium workloads, Medium/Long range | Extensive connectivity, redundant sensors, integrated ethernet switch for tactical radios. | Available |
| Skynode N | AI-heavy workloads | NVIDIA Orin powered, extensive connectivity, redundant sensors. | Pre-Release |

=== Software and Applications ===
A suite of software products complements AuterionOS, providing interfaces for operators and developers to control vehicles, manage fleets, and extend capabilities.

- Auterion Mission Control (AMC): The ground control station (GCS) software used for mission planning, flight control, and real-time vehicle monitoring. It is a commercial version based on the open-source QGroundControl project.
- Auterion Suite: A cloud-based platform for managing fleets of autonomous vehicles. It provides tools for flight logging, compliance reporting, and remote monitoring of vehicle operations.
- Auterion Nemyx: An AI-powered software capability that enables coordinated, autonomous drone swarms. The name is derived from Nemesis, the Greek goddess of retribution, reflecting its intended use for delivering precise, overwhelming action in combat applications.
- App Store: The Auterion platform supports a marketplace of first-party and third-party applications that run on AuterionOS. These apps provide specialized capabilities, including FPV TGT Guidance for terminal strikes, Swarming for coordinated flight, and the OKSI app for navigation in GPS-denied environments.

This integrated hardware and software stack is built upon a set of foundational open-source standards governed by the Dronecode Foundation.

== Government and Defense Programs ==
Auterion has established a significant presence in the government and defense sectors, with a particular focus on the U.S. Department of Defense (DoD) and allied nations. This has become a primary area of business for the company, driven by the increasing military demand for low-cost, scalable, and autonomous uncrewed systems across air, land, and sea domains, as demonstrated in the war in Ukraine.

Auterion is involved in several major government and defense initiatives:

- Blue sUAS Architecture: Auterion provides the U.S. DoD with a government-approved distribution of its software, which is based on PX4 and MAVLink. This serves as a common software standard for the DoD's small Uncrewed Aerial Systems (sUAS) program, ensuring interoperability across different vendors.
- Ukraine "Strike Kits": The company secured a $50 million Pentagon contract to deliver 33,000 AI-enhanced "strike kits" to Ukrainian forces. These kits, based on the Skynode S hardware, provide autonomous terminal guidance and electronic warfare resistance, representing one of the largest deployments of autonomous technology.
- Defense Innovation Unit (DIU) - Project Artemis: In March 2025, Auterion was selected as one of four companies to prototype long-range, one-way UAS platforms capable of operating in contested environments.
- Defense Innovation Unit (DIU) - EMI Project: On August 21, 2024, Auterion was chosen as one of three companies to develop solutions for controlling small UAS in electromagnetically contested environments, addressing challenges such as jamming.
- Taiwan (NCSIST) Partnership: Auterion signed a Memorandum of Understanding with Taiwan’s National Chung-Shan Institute of Science and Technology in June 2025. The partnership focuses on integrating AuterionOS and the Nemyx swarming platform into Taiwan's sovereign drone ecosystem to enhance its defensive capabilities.
- Rheinmetall Partnership: The company established a long-term cooperation agreement with the German defense contractor Rheinmetall to jointly develop a homogeneous operating system for various unmanned military systems, including air, land, and naval platforms. Rheinmetall has bolstered this relationship by becoming a stakeholder in Auterion.

== See also ==
- 3D Robotics
- DJI
- Helsing (company)
