= 3DR =

3DR may refer to

- 3D Realms, American video game publisher and developer
- 3D Robotics, American unmanned aerial vehicle maker
