= Autonomous navigation =

Autonomous navigation could refer to:

- Autonomous aircraft
- autonomous navigation for spacecraft, e.g. the Autonav on Deep Space 1
- autonomous navigation of robots (including planetary rovers); see Autonomous robot § Autonomous navigation
- autonomous navigation of ships or watercraft, see Unmanned surface vehicle
- autonomous proximity operations, e.g. spacecraft rendezvous
