= Automated flight attending =

Automated flight attending involves the use of automation to replace some of the tasks, that are currently done by flight attendants.

== Examples ==
=== Food delivery ===
In 1965, Martin Limanoff created one of the earliest automated food delivery systems, consisting of a square box that was designed to travel up and down the aisle along a monorail track on the cabin floor. However, it is not known if this was ever used on commercial flights. In 2015, Sell GMBH, a German division of aeroplane equipment company Zodiac Aerospace, filed a patent for a food delivery mechanism that would distribute food using automated conveyor belts, allowing passengers to access their food on demand by pressing buttons on the in-flight entertainment system, causing the food distributor to rise out of the floor.

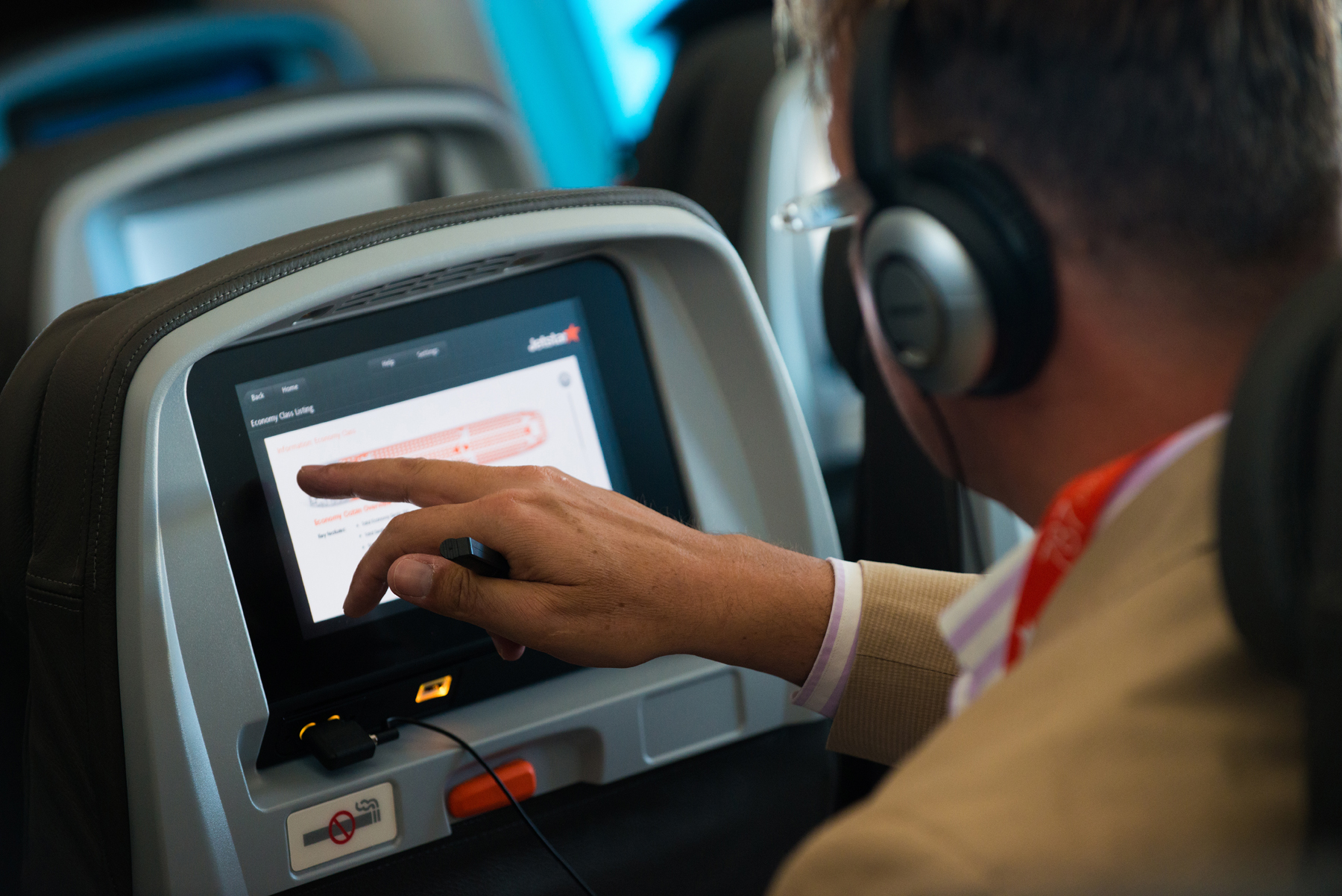
A man using a modern in-flight entertainment system

=== Food order ===
Many In-flight entertainment systems, such as Virgin America's 'Red' playbook and Panasonic Avionics' eX2, allow passengers to order food or drink using the IFE touchscreens. A passenger selects one of the meal options available for purchase, swipes their credit card through the in-seat ordering system, and then a flight attendant brings the meal to their seat.

=== Drink dispensing ===
Introduced in 2012, The SkyTender is a robot bartender which can dispense more than 30 different drinks, including soft drinks, coffee, wine, and cocktails, at the touch of a button or two. The SkyTender took its first flight on the German airline, WDL Aviation, going from Cologne to Palma, Majorca.

== In popular culture ==
Premiered on May 2, 2015, comedy show Saturday Night Live featured fictional automated flight attendants on the airline company Virgin America.

== See also ==
- Autonomous aircraft
- Autopilot
- Delivery drone
- Unmanned aerial vehicle
