= Slugs (autopilot system) =

Slugs is an open-source autopilot system oriented toward inexpensive autonomous aircraft. Low cost and wide availability enable hobbyist use in small remotely piloted aircraft. The project started in 2009 and is being further developed and used at Autonomous Systems Lab of University of California Santa Cruz. Several vendors produce Slugs autopilots and accessories.

== Overview ==
An autopilot allows a remotely piloted aircraft to be flown out of sight. All hardware and software is open-source and freely available to anyone under the MIT licensing agreement. free software autopilots provide more flexible hardware and software. Users can modify the autopilot based on their own special requirements, such as forest fire evaluation. The free software approach from Slugs is similar to that from the paparazzi Project, PX4 autopilot, ArduPilot and OpenPilot where low cost and availability enables its hobbyist use in small remotely piloted aircraft such as micro air vehicles and miniature UAVs. Such frameworks are common in Open-source robotics.

=== Software ===
The open-source software suite contains everything to let airborne systems fly.

== See also ==
- Crowdsourcing
- Micro air vehicle
