= ArduCopter =

Autopilot program

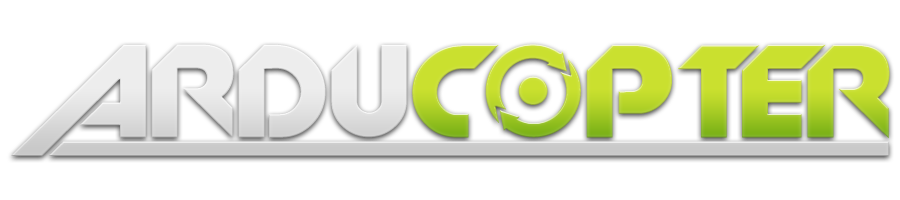
- Developer(s): ArduPilot Development Team and Community
- Stable release: 3.5.7 / July 2018
- Operating system: Cross-platform
- Type: Unmanned aerial vehicle
- License: GPLv3
- Website: https://ardupilot.org/copter/

ArduPilot:Copter previously named APM:Copter or ArduCopter is the multicopter unmanned aerial vehicle version of the open-source ArduPilot autopilot platform.

The free software approach from ArduCopter is similar to that of the Paparazzi Project and PX4 autopilot where low cost and availability enables its hobbyist use in small remotely piloted aircraft such as micro air vehicles and miniature UAVs.

Original Unboxing ArduCopter by Chris Anderson by Jani Hirvinen and his team at DIYDrones was released in August 2010.

== See also ==
- Open-source robotics
- Crowdsourcing
- Micro air vehicle
