= Pix4D =

Swiss software company

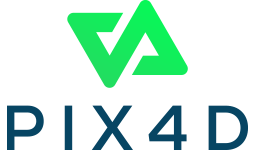
- Developer: Pix4D
- Release: 2011
- Stable release: 4.10.1 / February 16, 2026
- Operating system: Windows, Linux, MacOs
- Available in: EN, ES, FR, DE, IT, JP, KO, zh-CN, zh-TW, RU
- Type: photogrammetry, 3D computer graphics software, computer vision, Point cloud
- License: Proprietary
- Website: pix4d.com

Pix4D is a Swiss software company that specializes in terrestrial and drone photogrammetry mapping software. It was founded in 2011 as a spinoff from the École Polytechnique Fédérale de Lausanne (EPFL) Computer Vision Lab in Switzerland. It develops a suite of software products that use photogrammetry and computer vision algorithms to transform DSLR, fisheye, RGB, thermal and multispectral images into 2D maps and 3D modeling. The company has 7 international offices, with its headquarters in Lausanne, Switzerland.

Pix4D's suite of products includes PIX4Dmapper, PIX4Dfields, PIX4Dcloud, PIX4Dreact, PIX4Dsurvey, PIX4Dcatch, PIX4Dmatic, and PIX4Dengine.

Its software lines operate on desktop, cloud, and mobile platforms. PIX4Dmapper has been used to map the Matterhorn mountain in Switzerland, the Christ the Redeemer statue in Brazil and also the 2018 lower Puna eruption in Hawaii island. Pix4D software uses imagery captured with drones, mobile devices, or planes to recreate scenes in 2D and 3D.

== 10 year anniversary & rebranding ==
In June 2021, Pix4D celebrated its 10-year anniversary. To commemorate the event, Pix4D updated its logo and website styling. The rebranding involved new styles for the logo font and color scheme, as well as updated style formats for product names and color schemes.

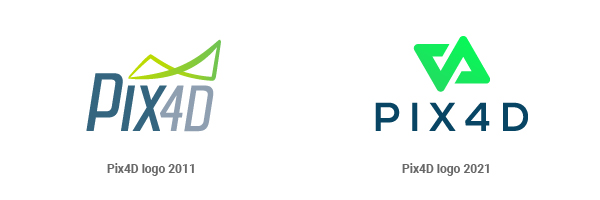

== Pix4D User Conference ==
Pix4D launched its first User Conference in 2019. The event was held in October 2019 in Denver, Colorado. It was attended by over 250 people and hosted at the McNichols Civic Center Building. Pix4D announced two new products at the event: PIX4Dreact and PIX4Dsurvey. Apart from keynote speeches by Pix4D staff members, there were also guest presentations by visitors.

As a result of the Covid-19 pandemic, no event took place in 2020. In 2021, Pix4D launched a User Conference called "From the Ground Up". The conference was live for 24 hours and included 40 sessions broadcast in 4 languages - English, Japanese, Spanish, and Portuguese. The event consisted of Pix4D product presentations, user keynote talks to demonstrate how people were using Pix4D software, and a Speed Quiz with the Pix4D Training Team.

In 2022, Pix4D hosted 2 User Conference events - 1 in Tokyo and 1 in Denver, Colorado. The structure was similar to the 2019 event.

== Languages ==
Pix4D's website is available in multiple languages: English, French, German, Spanish, Chinese, Japanese, and Portuguese.

The software is constantly being updated into a wide variety of languages

== Industries ==
The major industries that Pix4D software is used, are:

- Aerial survey
- Agriculture and Precision agriculture
- Construction
- Cultural heritage
- Education
- Energy
- Engineering
- Mapping
- Government
- Insurance
- Inspection
- Surveying
- Military
- Mining
- Public safety and Emergency respond
- Research
- Humanitarian aid and Development aid
- Natural resources and Environment
- Real estate
- Virtual reality (VR)
