= Paparazzi Project =

Open-source hardware and software for autopiloting aircraft

Paparazzi is an open-source autopilot system oriented toward inexpensive autonomous aircraft. Low cost and availability enable hobbyist use in small remotely piloted aircraft. The project began in 2003, and is being further developed and used at École nationale de l'aviation civile (ENAC), a French civil aeronautics academy. Several vendors are currently producing Paparazzi autopilots and accessories.

== Overview ==
An autopilot allows a remotely piloted aircraft to be flown out of sight. All hardware and software is open-source and freely available to anyone under the GNU licensing agreement. Open Source autopilots provide flexible software: users can easily modify the autopilot based on their own special requirements, such as forest fire evaluation. Paparazzi collaborators share ideas and information using the same MediaWiki software that is used by Wikipedia.

Paparazzi accepts commands and sensor data, and adjusts flight controls accordingly. For example, a command might be to climb at a certain rate, and paparazzi will adjust power and/or control surfaces. As of 2010 paparazzi did not have a good speed hold and changing function, because no air speed sensor reading is considered by the controller.

Delft University of Technology released its Lisa/S chip project in 2013, which is based on Paparazzi.

== Mechanisms ==
=== Hardware ===
Paparazzi supports for multiple hardware designs, including STM32 and LPC2100 series microcontrollers. A number of CAD files have been released.

Paparazzi provides for a minimum set of flight sensors:

- Attitude (orientation about center of mass) estimation is done with a set of infrared thermopiles.
- Position and altitude are obtained from a standard GPS receiver.
- Roll rate measurement may be input from an optional gyroscope.
- Acceleration from optional inertial sensors.
- Direction from optional magnetic sensors.

=== Software ===
The open-source software suite "contains everything" to let "airborne system fly reliably".

== See also ==
- Crowdsourcing
- Micro air vehicle
- ArduCopter open source autopilot software
- OpenPilot open source autopilot software
- Open-source robotics
- PX4 autopilot
- Slugs (autopilot system)
- Ardupilot
