= NuttX =

Real-time operating system

Apache NuttX
- Modern vector logo of Apache NuttX RTOS
- Developer: Apache Software Foundation
- Written in: C, C++, assembly
- OS family: POSIX
- Working state: Current
- Source model: Open source
- Initial release: 2007; 19 years ago
- Latest release: 13.0.1 / September 15, 2026; 18 days ago
- Repository: github.com/apache/nuttx
- Marketing target: Embedded systems
- Supported platforms: ARM, AVR, AVR32, HCS12, LM32, MIPS, RISC-V, OpenRISC, SuperH, Xtensa, x86, x86-64, Z80
- Kernel type: Real-time monolithic kernel
- License: Apache License 2.0
- Official website: nuttx.apache.org

Apache NuttX is a free and open-source real-time operating system (RTOS) with an emphasis on technical standards compliance and on having a small footprint. It is scalable from 8-bit to 64-bit microcontroller environments. The main governing standards in NuttX are from the Portable Operating System Interface (POSIX) and the American National Standards Institute (ANSI). Further standard application programming interfaces (APIs) from Unix and other common RTOSes (such as VxWorks) are adopted for functions unavailable under these standards, or inappropriate for deeply embedded environments, such as the fork() system call.

NuttX was initially released in 2007 under the permissive BSD license. In December 2019, it began incubation at the Apache Software Foundation.; its license was changed from the BSD license to the Apache License and it graduated to a top-level project in November 2022.

== Projects using NuttX ==
- PX4 autopilot drones.
- Samsung TizenRT based on NuttX RTOS.
- Xiaomi Vela, an IoT software platform based on NuttX.

== See also ==
- Comparison of real-time operating systems
