= ArduPilot =

Open-source autopiloting library

- Developers: ArduPilot Development Team and Community
- Release: 2009; 17 years ago
- Written in: C++, Python
- Operating system: Cross-platform
- Type: Autopilot
- License: GPLv3
- Website: ardupilot.org
- Repository: github.com/ArduPilot

ArduPilot is an autopilot software program that can control multirotor drones, fixed-wing and VTOL aircraft, RC helicopters, ROVs, ground rovers, boats, submarines, uncrewed surface vessels (USVs), AntennaTrackers and blimps. It is published as open source software under the GNU GPL version 3.

ArduPilot was originally developed by hobbyists to control model aircraft and rovers and has evolved into a full-featured and reliable autopilot used by industry, research organisations, amateurs, and militaries. (Note: The ArduPilot Developer Code of Conduct explicitly forbids contributing work that could facilitate the weaponization of ArduPilot. However, this only applies to members of the ArduPilot Development Team, as the official FAQ of GNU GPL version 3, under which ArduPilot is licensed, explicitly states that military use of licensed code cannot be prohibited.)

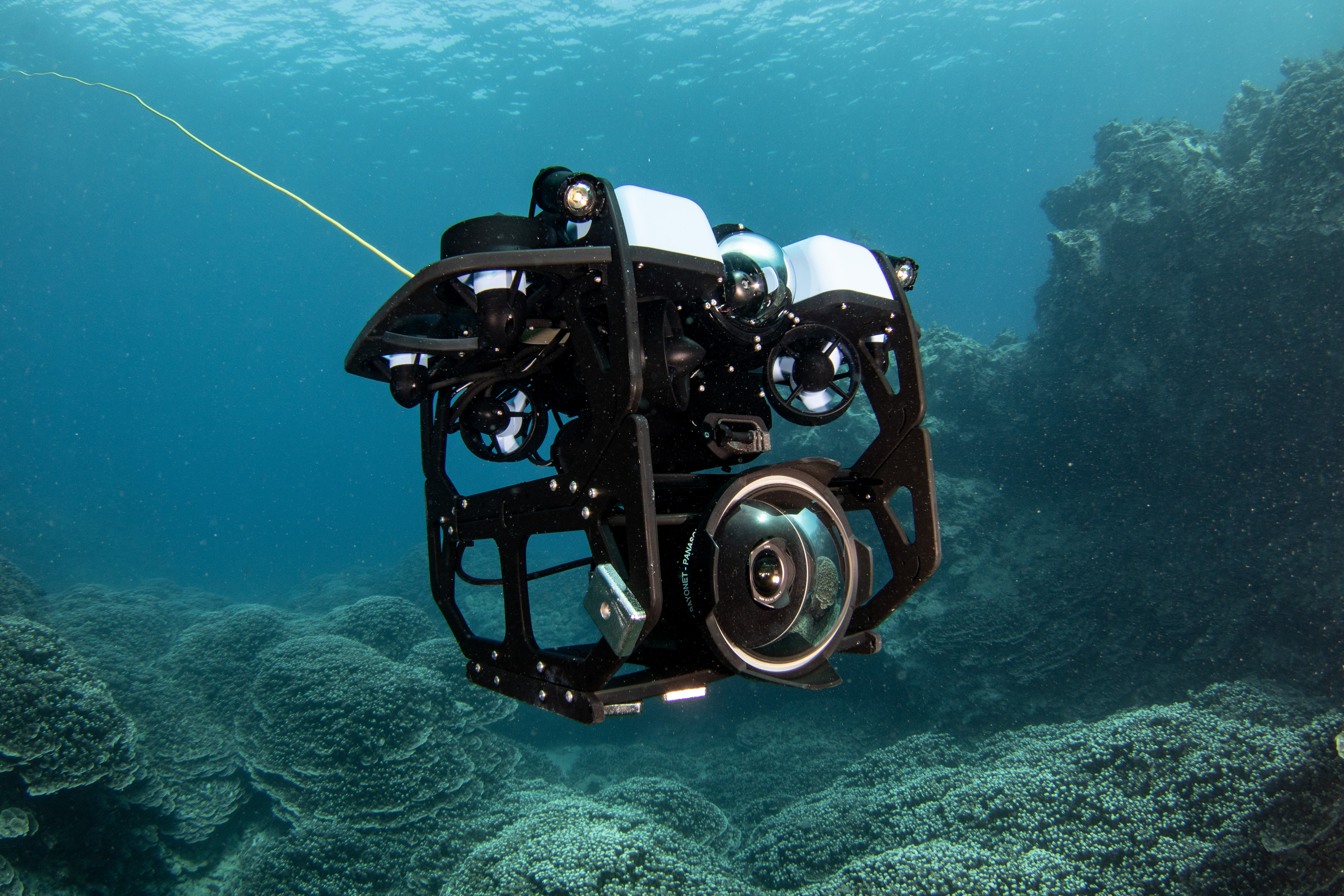
BlueROV2 diving with ArduSub

An octocopter flying with Ardupilot

== Characteristics ==
The ArduPilot software suite consists of navigation software (typically referred to as firmware when it is compiled to binary form for microcontroller hardware targets) running on the vehicle (Copter, Plane, Rover, AntennaTracker, or Sub), along with ground station controlling software including Mission Planner, APM Planner, QGroundControl, MavProxy, Tower and others.

=== Common to all vehicles ===
ArduPilot provides a large set of features, including the following common for all vehicles:

- Fully autonomous, semi-autonomous and fully manual flight modes, programmable missions with 3D waypoints, optional geofencing.
- Stabilization options to negate the need for a third party co-pilot.
- Simulation with a variety of simulators, including ArduPilot Software in the Loop (SITL) Simulator.
- Large number of navigation sensors supported, including several models of RTK GPSs, traditional L1 GPSs, barometers, magnetometers, laser and sonar rangefinders, optical flow, ADS-B transponder, infrared, airspeed, sensors, and computer vision/motion capture devices.
- Sensor communication via SPI, I²C, CAN Bus, Serial communication, SMBus.
- Failsafes for loss of radio contact, GPS and breaching a predefined boundary, minimum battery power level.
- Support for navigation in GPS denied environments, with vision-based positioning, optical flow, SLAM, Ultra Wide Band positioning.
- Support for actuators such as parachutes and magnetic grippers.
- Support for brushless and brushed motors.
- Photographic and video gimbal support and integration.
- Integration and communication with powerful secondary, or "companion", computers
- Rich documentation through ArduPilot wiki.
- Support and discussion through ArduPilot discourse forum, Gitter chat channels, GitHub, Facebook.

=== Copter-specific ===
- Flight modes: Stabilize, Alt Hold, Loiter, RTL (Return-to-Launch), Auto, Acro, AutoTune, Brake, Circle, Drift, Guided, (and Guided_NoGPS), Land, PosHold, Sport, Throw, Follow Me, Simple, Super Simple, Avoid_ADSB.
- Auto-tuning
- Wide variety of frame types supported, including tricopters, quadcopters, hexacopters, flat and co-axial octocopters, and custom motor configurations
- Support for traditional electric and gas helicopters, mono copters, tandem helicopters.

=== Plane-specific ===
- Fly By Wire modes, loiter, auto, acrobatic modes.
- Take-off options: Hand launch, bungee, catapult, vertical transition (for VTOL planes).
- Landing options: Adjustable glide slope, helical, reverse thrust, net, vertical transition (for VTOL planes).
- Auto-tuning, simulation with JSBSIM, X-Plane and RealFlight simulators.
- Support for a large variety of VTOL architectures: Quadplanes, Tilt wings, tilt rotors, tail sitters, ornithopters.
- Optimization of 3 or 4 channel airplanes.

=== Rover-specific ===
- Manual, Learning, Auto, Steering, Hold and Guided operational modes.
- Support for wheeled and track architectures.

=== Submarine-specific ===
- Depth hold: Using pressure-based depth sensors, submarines can maintain depth within a few centimeters.
- Light Control: Control of subsea lighting through the controller.

ArduPilot is fully documented within its wiki, totaling the equivalent of about 700 printed pages and divided in six top sections: The Copter, Plane, Rover, and Submarine vehicle related subsections are aimed at users. A "developer" subsection for advanced uses is aimed primarily at software and hardware engineers, and a "common" section regrouping information common to all vehicle types is shared within the first four sections.

== Supported hardware ==
Copter, Plane, Rover, AntennaTracker, or Sub software runs on a wide variety of embedded hardware (including full blown Linux computers), typically consisting of one or more microcontroller or microprocessor connected to peripheral sensors used for navigation. These sensors include MEMS gyroscopes and accelerometers at a minimum, necessary for multirotor flight and plane stabilization. Sensors usually include, in addition, one or more compass, altimeter (barometric) and GPS, along with optional additional sensors such as optical flow sensors, airspeed indicators, laser or sonar altimeters or rangefinders, monocular, stereoscopic or RGB-D cameras. Sensors may be on the same electronic board, or external.

Ground Station software, used for programming or monitoring vehicle operation, is available for Windows, Linux, macOS, iOS, and Android.

ArduPilot runs on a wide variety of hardware platforms, including the following, listed in alphabetical order:

- Intel Aero (Linux or STM32 Base)
- Airvolute DroneCore 2
- AXL Drone
- APM 2.X (Atmel Mega Microcontroller Arduino base), designed by Jordi Munoz in 2010. APM, for ArduPilotMega, only runs on older versions of ArduPilot.
- BeagleBone Blue and PXF Mini (BeagleBone Black cape).
- The Cube, formerly called Pixhawk 2, (ARM Cortex microcontroller base), designed by ProfiCNC in 2015.
- Navigator Flight Controller by Blue Robotics
- Navio2 and Navio+ (Raspberry Pi Linux based), designed by Emlid.
- Parrot Bebop, and Parrot C.H.U.C.K., designed by Parrot, S.A.
- Pixhawk, (ARM Cortex microcontroller base), originally designed by Lorenz Meier and ETH Zurich, improved and launched in 2013 by PX4, 3DRobotics, and the ArduPilot development team.
- PixRacer, (ARM Cortex microcontroller base) designed by AUAV.
- Qualcomm SnapDragon (Linux base).
- Virtual Robotics VRBrain (ARM Cortex microcontroller base).
- Xilinx SoC Zynq processor (Linux base, ARM and FPGA processor).

In addition to the above base navigation platforms, ArduPilot supports integration and communication with on-vehicle companion, or auxiliary computers for advanced navigation requiring more powerful processing. These include Nvidia TX1 and TX2 (Nvidia Jetson architecture), Intel Edison and Intel Joule, HardKernel ODROID, and Raspberry Pi computers.

== History ==
=== Early years, 2007–2012 ===
The ArduPilot project earliest roots date back to late 2007 when Jordi Munoz, who later co-founded 3DRobotics with Chris Anderson, wrote an Arduino program (which he called "ArduCopter") to stabilize an RC Helicopter. In 2009 Munoz and Anderson released Ardupilot 1.0 (flight controller software) along with a hardware board it could run on. That same year Munoz, who had built a traditional RC helicopter UAV able to fly autonomously, won the first Sparkfun AVC competition. The project grew further thanks to many members of the DIY Drones community, including Chris Anderson who championed the project and had founded the forum based community earlier in 2007.

The first ArduPilot version supported only fixed-wing aircraft and was based on a thermopile sensor, which relies on determining the location of the horizon relative to the aircraft by measuring the difference in temperature between the sky and the ground. Later, the system was improved to replace thermopiles with an Inertial Measurement Unit (IMU) using a combination of accelerometers, gyroscopes and magnetometers. Vehicle support was later expanded to other vehicle types which led to the Copter, Plane, Rover, and Submarine subprojects.

The years 2011 and 2012 witnessed an explosive growth in the autopilot functionality and codebase size, thanks in large part to new participation from Andrew "Tridge" Tridgell and HAL author Pat Hickey. Tridge's contributions included automatic testing and simulation capabilities for Ardupilot, along with PyMavlink and Mavproxy. Hickey was instrumental in bringing the AP_HAL library to the code base. The HAL (Hardware Abstraction Layer) greatly simplified and modularized the code base by introducing and confining low-level hardware implementation specifics to a separate hardware library.

2012 also saw Randy Mackay taking the role of lead maintainer of Copter, after a request from former maintainer Jason Short, and Tridge taking over the role of lead Plane maintainer, after Doug Weibel who went on to earn a Ph.D. in Aerospace Engineering. Both Randy and Tridge are current lead maintainers to date.

=== Maturity, 2013–2016 ===
While early versions of ArduPilot used the APM (ArduPilotMega) flight controller, an AVR CPU running the Arduino open-source programming language (which explains the "Ardu" part of the project name), later years witnessed a significant re-write of the code base in C++ with many supporting utilities written in Python.

Between 2013 and 2014 ArduPilot evolved to run on a range of hardware platforms and operating system beyond the original Arduino Atmel based microcontroller architecture, first with the commercial introduction of the Pixhawk hardware flight controller, a collaborative effort between PX4, 3DRobotics and the ArduPilot development team, and later to the Parrot's Bebop2 and the Linux-based flight controllers like Raspberry Pi based NAVIO2 and BeagleBone based ErleBrain. A key event within this time period included the first flight of a plane under Linux in mid 2014.

Late 2014 saw the formation of DroneCode, formed to bring together the leading open source UAV software projects, and most notably to solidify the relationship and collaboration of the ArduPilot and the PX4 projects. ArduPilot's involvement with DroneCode ended in September 2016. 2015 was also a banner year for 3DRobotics, a heavy sponsor of ArduPilot development, with its introduction of the Solo quadcopter, an off the shelf quadcopter running ArduPilot. Solo's commercial success, however, was not to be.

Fall of 2015 again saw a key event in the history of the autopilot, with a swarm of 50 planes running ArduPilot simultaneously flown at the Advanced Robotic Systems Engineering Laboratory (ARSENL) team at the Naval Postgraduate School.

Within this time period, ArduPilot's code base was significantly refactored, to the point where it ceased to bear any similarity to its early Arduino years.

=== Since 2018 ===
ArduPilot code evolution continues with support for integrating and communicating with powerful companion computers for autonomous navigation, plane support for additional VTOL architectures, integration with ROS, support for gliders, and tighter integration for submarines. The project evolves under the umbrella of ArduPilot.org, a project within the Software in the Public Interest not-for-profit organisation. ArduPilot is sponsored in part by a growing list of corporate partners.

=== UAV Outback Challenge ===
In 2012, the CanberraUAV Team successfully took first place in the prestigious UAV Outback Challenge. The CanberraUAV Team included ArduPlane Developers and the airplane flown was controlled by an APM 2 Autopilot.

In 2014 the CanberraUAV Team and ArduPilot took first place again, by successfully delivering a bottle to the "lost" hiker. In 2016 ArduPilot placed first in the technically more challenging competition, ahead of strong competition from international teams.

=== Russo-Ukrainian war ===
In June 2025 ArduPilot was used successfully by the Ukrainian armed forces during the Russo-Ukrainian War to make attacks with 117 aerial drones on five Russian air bases, in what was named Operation Spiderweb. During this time, Ukrainian president Volodymyr Zelenskyy said that each drone had its own pilot to launch and command it remotely; this was done through the Russian mobile telephone network using ArduPilot.

== See also ==
- Open-source robotics

Other projects for autonomous aircraft control:

- PX4 autopilot
- Paparazzi Project
- Slugs

Other projects for ground vehicles & cars driven:

- OpenPilot
- Tesla Autopilot
