= Openpilot =

Open source driver assistance system

openpilot
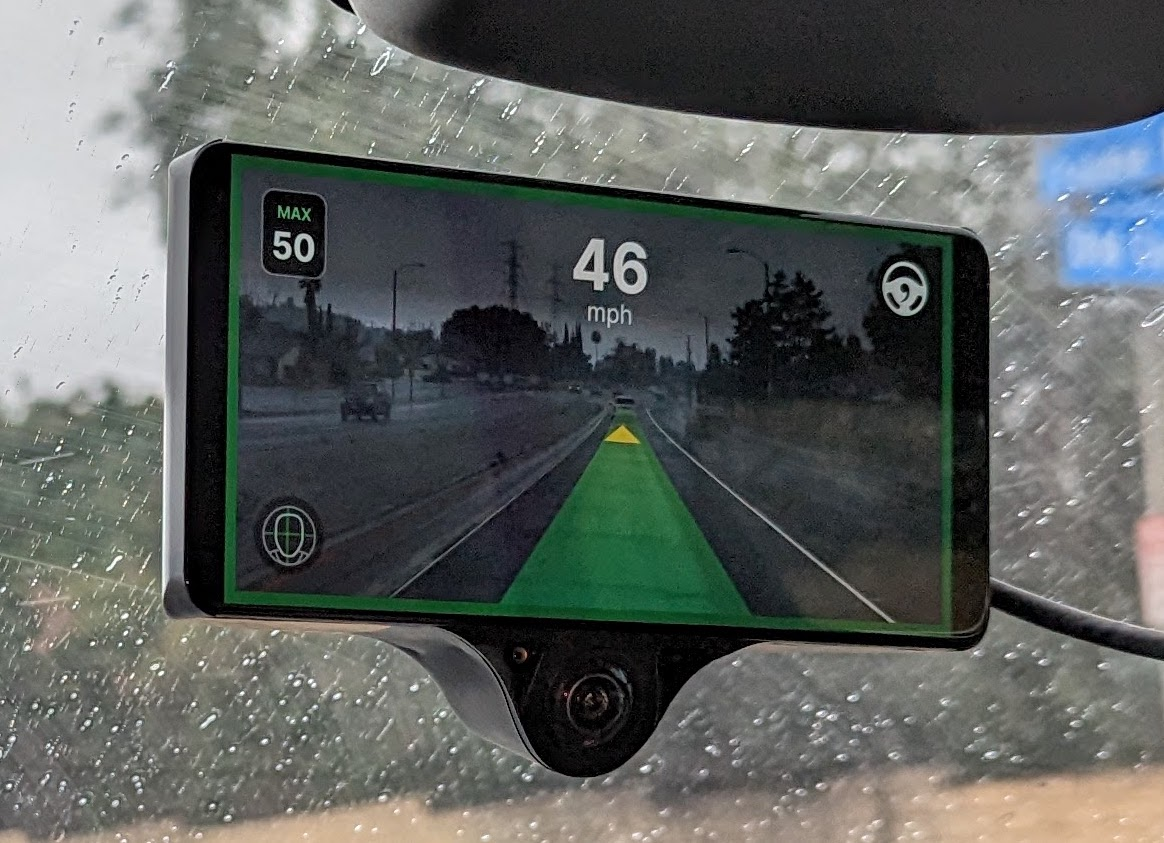
- Comma three running the openpilot software
- Original author: George Hotz
- Developer: comma.ai
- Release: 30 November 2016; 9 years ago
- Stable release: 0.11.0 (17 March 2026; 6 months ago)
- Written in: Python, C++, C
- Operating system: AGNOS, based on Ubuntu
- Platform: Qualcomm Snapdragon 845
- Standards: ISO 26262, MISRA C:2012
- Available in: 10 languages
- List of languages Arabic, Chinese (Simplified), Chinese (Traditional), French, German, Japanese, Korean, Portuguese, Thai, Turkish
- Type: Computer vision
- License: MIT License
- Website: comma.ai
- Repository: github.com/commaai/openpilot

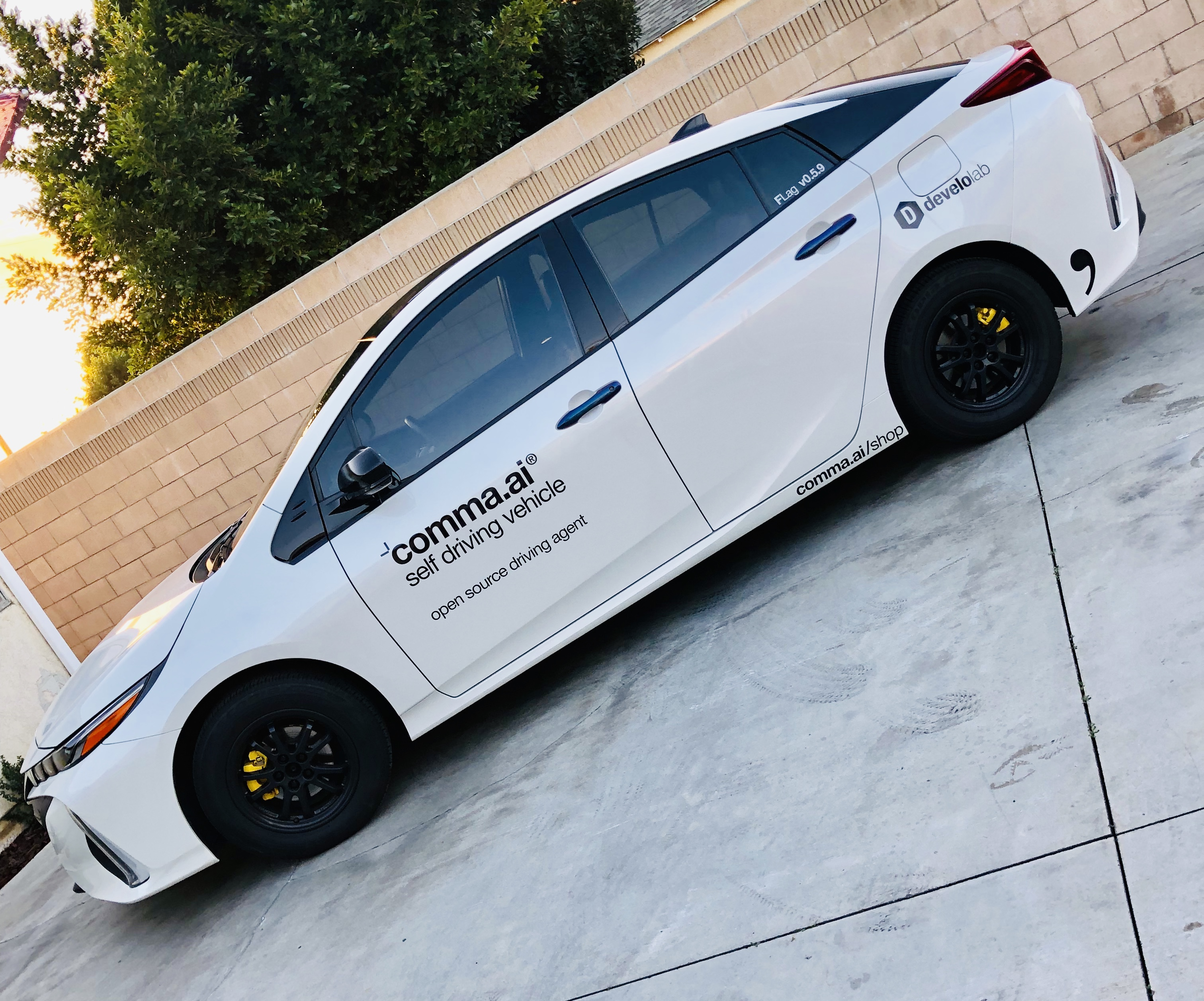
Toyota Prius with openpilot installed

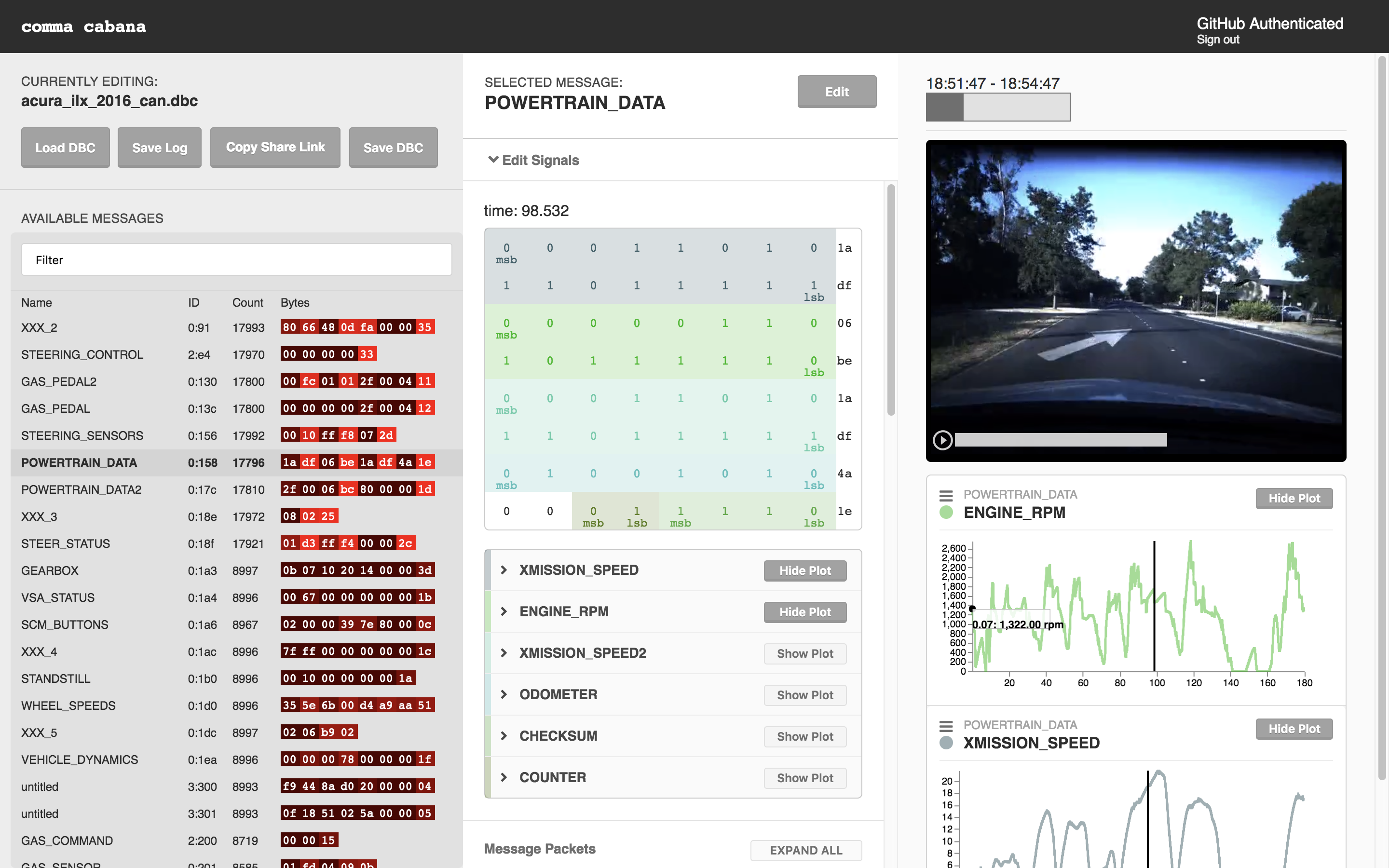
An old version of Cabana, a CAN Bus traffic visualiser, now part of openpilot tools

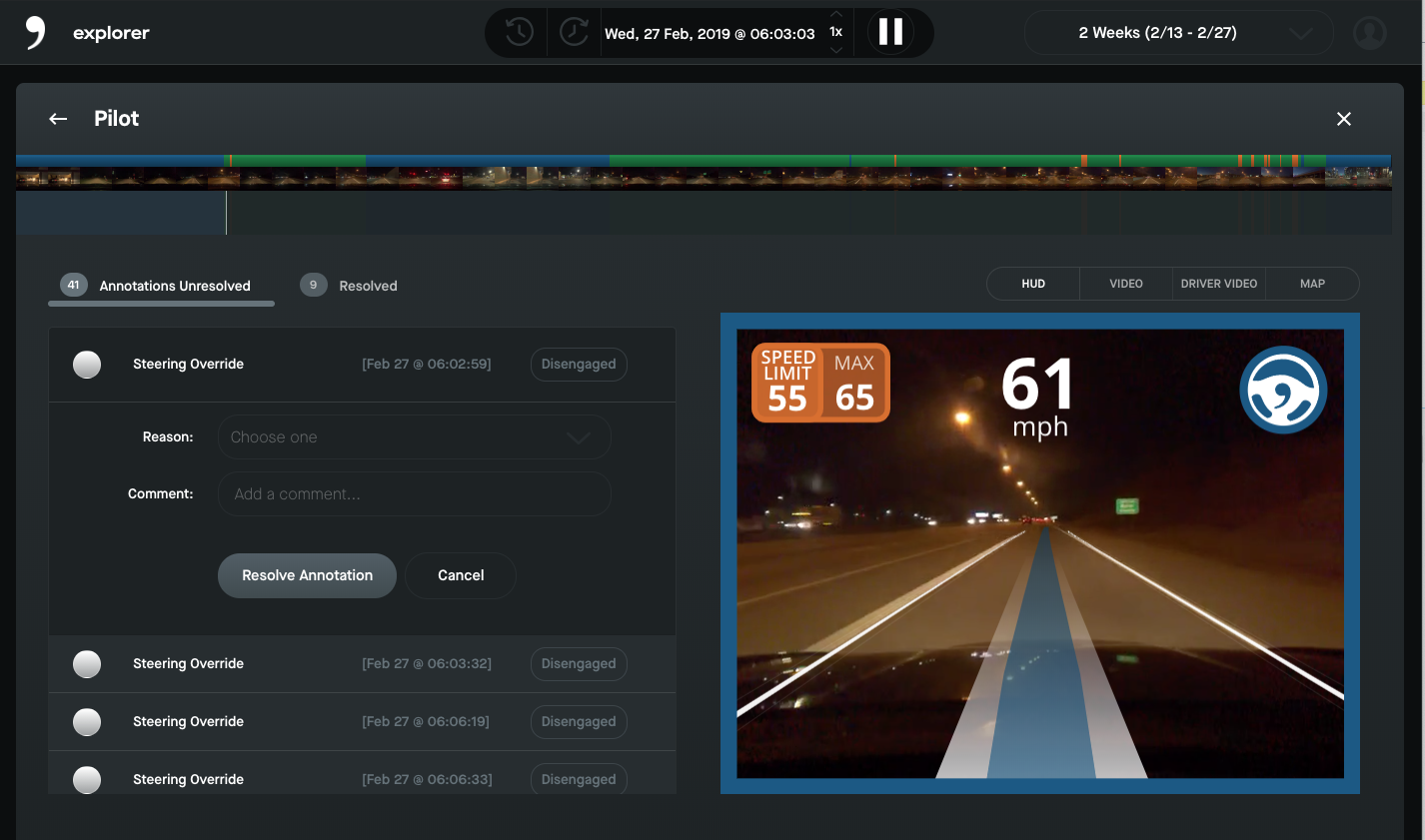
A user annotating a drive

Openpilot is an open-source, semi-automated driving software by comma.ai. When paired with aftermarket retrofit comma.ai hardware, it replaces advanced driver-assistance systems in vehicles. As of 2026, openpilot supports over 325 car models and has over 30,000 users, accumulating over 402,000,000 miles (647,000,000 km).

== History ==
Comma.ai was founded in September 2015 by George Hotz. The first version of openpilot was revealed in December 2015, showing functionality on a 2016 Acura ILX. The video and article instigated a cease and desist letter from the California Department of Motor Vehicles, claiming comma.ai was testing a self-driving car without a license.

Comma.ai announced a device called the Comma One at TechCrunch Disrupt in September 2016. On October 27, 2016, NHTSA issued a special order to comma.ai demanding detailed information about the comma one, to determine if the device complies with legally required Federal Motor Vehicle Safety Standards. After the order, comma.ai announced the cancellation of the comma one. Comma.ai open-sourced openpilot a month later, on November 30, 2016, emphasizing its intended use for research, without any warranty.

On January 7, 2020, comma.ai introduced the $999 "comma two" device at CES in Las Vegas. By October 2020, Comma.ai reported that openpilot had driven a total of 25 million miles. In November 2020, Consumer Reports ranked openpilot above all other advanced driver-assistance systems on the market.

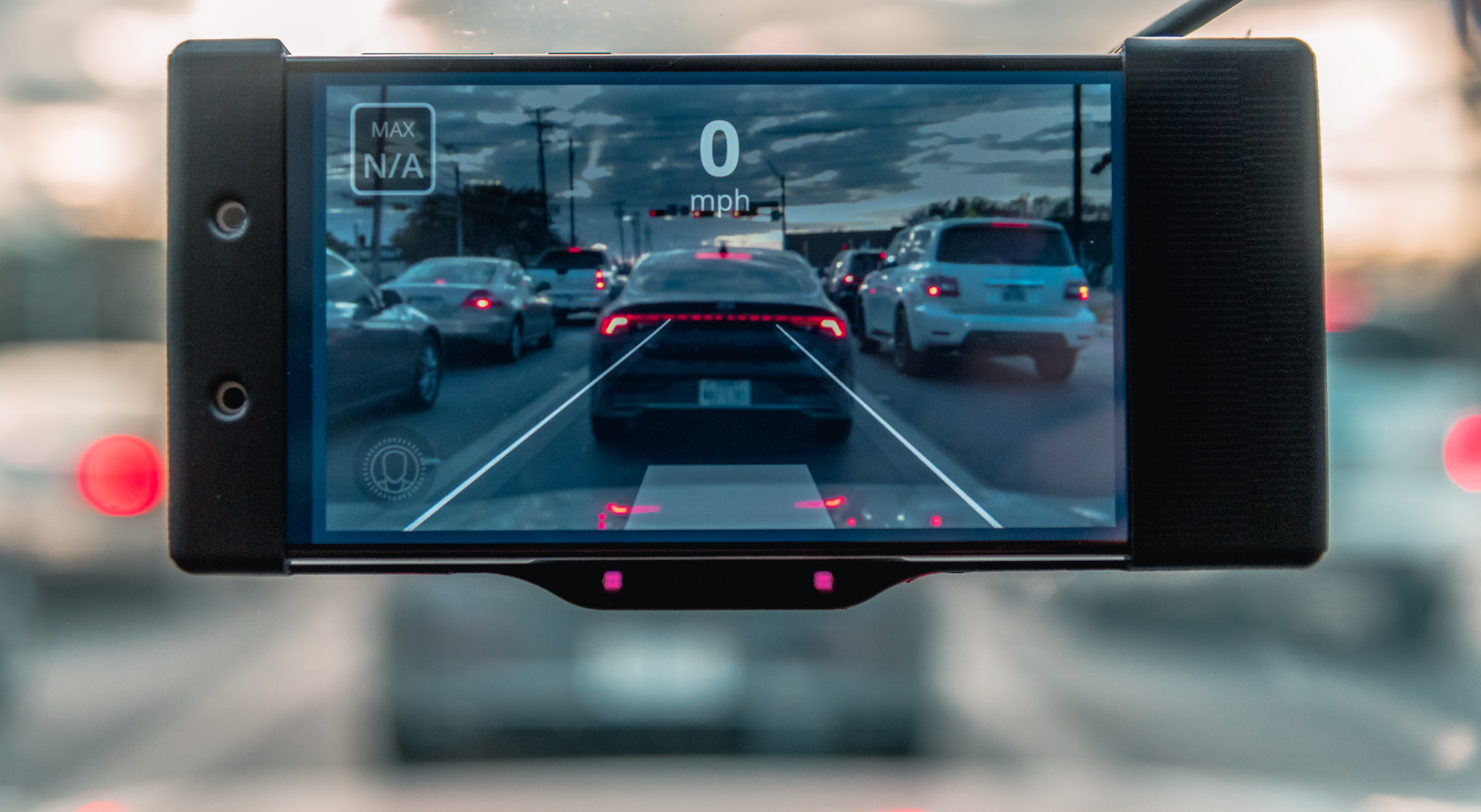
Comma two running the openpilot software

By January 2023, 5,000 units of openpilot-supported Comma 3 devices were in use. In April 2024, a 2017 Toyota Prius equipped with a comma 3X unit running openpilot was used on a semi-autonomous Cannonball run record, involving a drive across the United States from the East Coast to the West Coast. The drive took 43 hours and 18 minutes at 98.4% autonomy.

In September 2026, National Highway Traffic Safety Administration launched an investigation into comma.ai, citing five crashes that resulted in three deaths and eleven injuries.

== Features ==
In contrast to traditional autonomous driving solutions where the perception, prediction, and planning units are separate "modules", openpilot adopts a system-level end-to-end design to predict the car's trajectory directly from the camera images. openpilot's end-to-end design is a neural network that is trained by comma.ai using real-world driving data uploaded by openpilot users.

Openpilot includes a "navigate on openpilot" akin to Tesla Full Self-Driving. Openpilot features include lane centering, adaptive cruise control, driver monitoring, and automatic lane change.
