= PX4 autopilot =

Flight-control software for unmanned vehicles

- Developers: PX4 Development Team and Community
- Release: March 2012
- Written in: C, C++
- Operating system: NuttX, ROS
- License: BSD-3-Clause
- Website: https://px4.io
- Repository: https://github.com/PX4/PX4-Autopilot

The PX4 autopilot is an open-source system for autonomous aircraft. The project was started in 2009.

== Overview ==
PX4 supports the following features:

- Multiple vehicle types, including fixed-wing aircraft, multicopters, helicopters, rovers, boats and underwater vehicles
- Fully manual, partially assisted and fully autonomous flight modes
- Integration with position, speed, altitude and rotation sensors
- Automatic triggering of cameras or external actuators

PX4 is capable of integrating with other autopilot software, such as the QGroundControl ground control station software, via the MAVLink protocol (though they provide limited px4 -> Unity documentation).

PX4 is open-source and available under a BSD-3-Clause license.

== See also ==
- Paparazzi Project
- ArduPilot
- Slugs
- OpenPilot
- Crowdsourcing
- Micro air vehicle
