= Convertawings A Quadrotor =

VTOL quadrotor helicopter aircraft

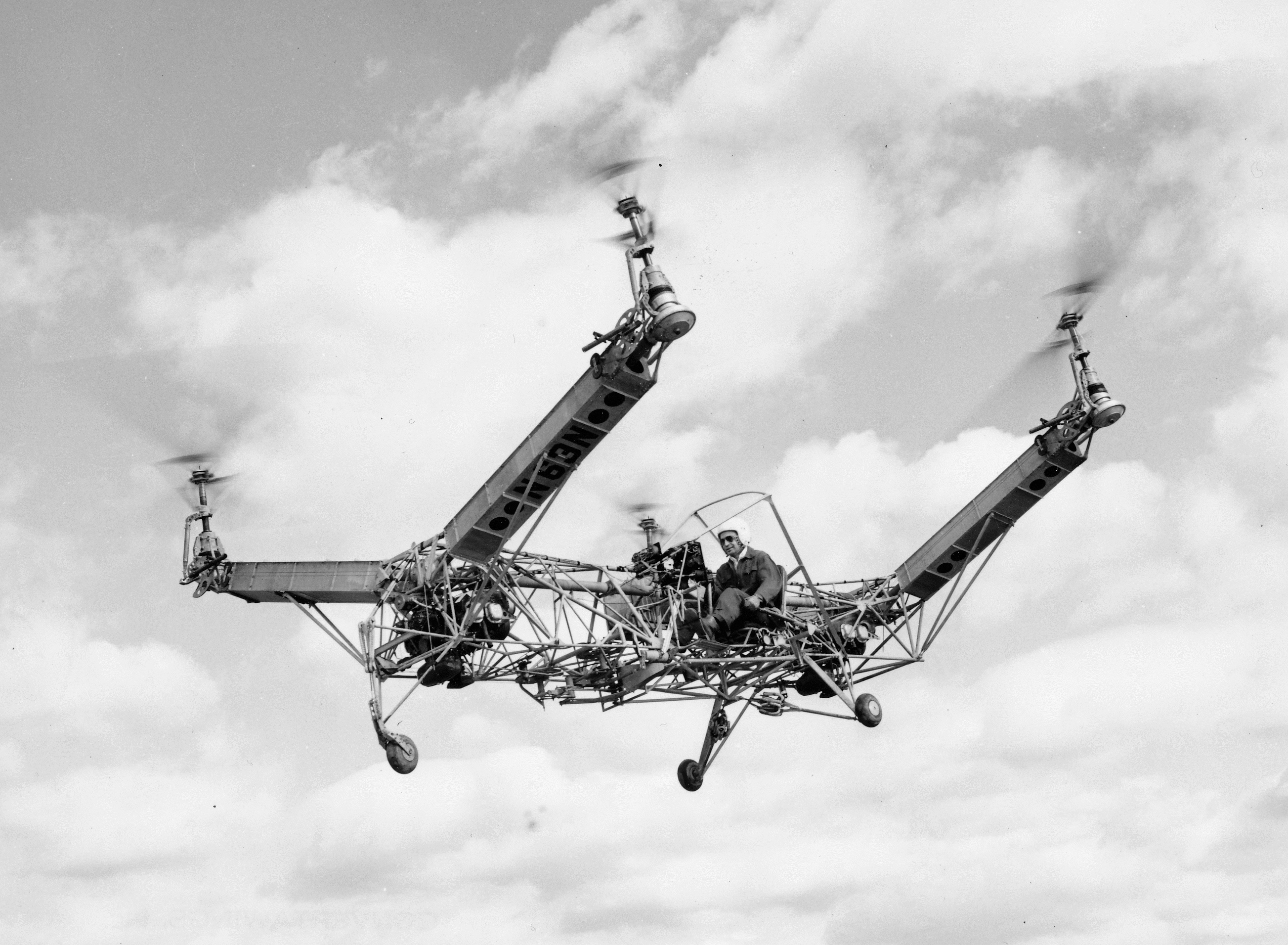

General information
- Type: VTOL helicopter
- National origin: United States
- Manufacturer: Convertawings, Inc
- Status: Canceled

History
- First flight: 1956
- Retired: 1957

The Convertawings A Quadrotor was the first VTOL quadrotor helicopter which archived forward flight, it was designed by the Convertawings, Inc.

== Design and development ==
The Model A Quadrotor was developed by Convertawings as a prototype and technology demonstrator for civilian and military quadrotors. The design is based on early quadrotor experiments by Étienne Œhmichen and George de Bothezat. The design features four rotors that are aligned in an "H" configuration, the rotors are mounted in tandem pairs on each side on four outriggers. The four rotors are powered by two Continental C-90 reciprocating engines. The power is transmitted using belts, shafts and an interconnected transition system. In case of an engine failure a single engine is capable of powering the entire aircraft.

In early quadrotor designs, the four rotors were typically arranged in an “H” configuration and employed simplified hubs with strap-mounted blades, representing a form of hingeless rotor. A key advantage of such multi-rotor configurations is the ability to eliminate complex cyclic pitch control systems used in conventional helicopters. Instead, control in pitch and roll can be achieved through differential collective pitch between the rotors, whereby thrust is varied across the rotor system. For example, increasing the pitch on one side while decreasing it on the opposite side produces a rolling moment.

Directional control (yaw) can likewise be obtained by varying rotor thrust and, in some designs, by slightly tilting the rotor axes. This allows forces to be generated that rotate the aircraft about its vertical axis. Such control principles demonstrated that quadrotor aircraft could achieve stable and effective flight using relatively simple mechanical systems.

The rotors themselves consisted of three 17 cm wide blades with a NACA 0015 airfoil. The blades rotated at a speed of 549 rpm and the tips archived a velocity of 170 m/s. Additionally it is noteworthy that the rotors surface area overlaps by around 20%.

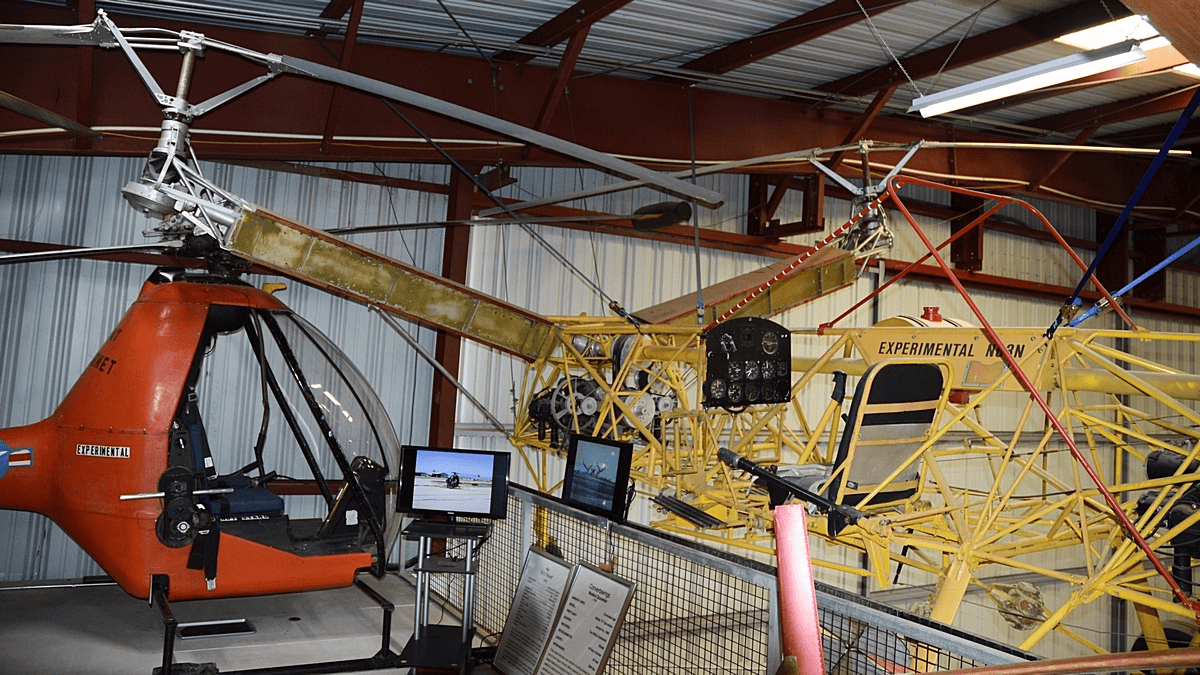
Convertawings Model A Quadrotor N63N 2 displayed at the Classic Rotors Museum. (on the right)

== Operational history ==
The first and only prototype was completed in 1955 and the first test flight took flight during March 1956. The test were conducted on Long Island, New York by the Convertawings A Quadrotor designer and test pilot David H.Kaplan. The Model A Quadrotor flew successful multiple times during 1956. It served successfully as a technology demonstrator, proving that forward flight was possible with a four rotor configuration for the first time. Additionally the Model A Quadrotor showed that differential thrust control was practical and effective for stable quadrotor flight. These tests influenced later multi rotor and VTOL aircraft designs. The program however was shortly after its first few flights cancelled due to a lack of commercial interest and cutbacks in military spending during the time.

== Aircraft on display ==
Currently the only known still existing model is being displayed at the Classic Rotors Museum, in Ramona, California.

== Specifications ==
Data from Aviation Magazine p. 26-29, 42

General characteristics

- Crew: 1
- Gross weight: 998 kg (2,200 lb)
- Max takeoff weight: 5,669 kg (12,499 lb)
- Powerplant: 2 × Continental C-90 reciprocating engines, 67 kW (90 shp) each
- Main rotor diameter: 4 × 5.950 m (19.521 ft)
- Main rotor area: 33.8999 m^{2} (364.895 sq ft)

Performance

- Maximum speed: 138 km/h (86 mph, 75 kn)
- Disk loading: 9.07 kg/m^{2} (1.857 lb/sq ft)

== See also ==
Related lists

- List of single seat helicopters
