= Quadcopter =

Helicopter with four rotors

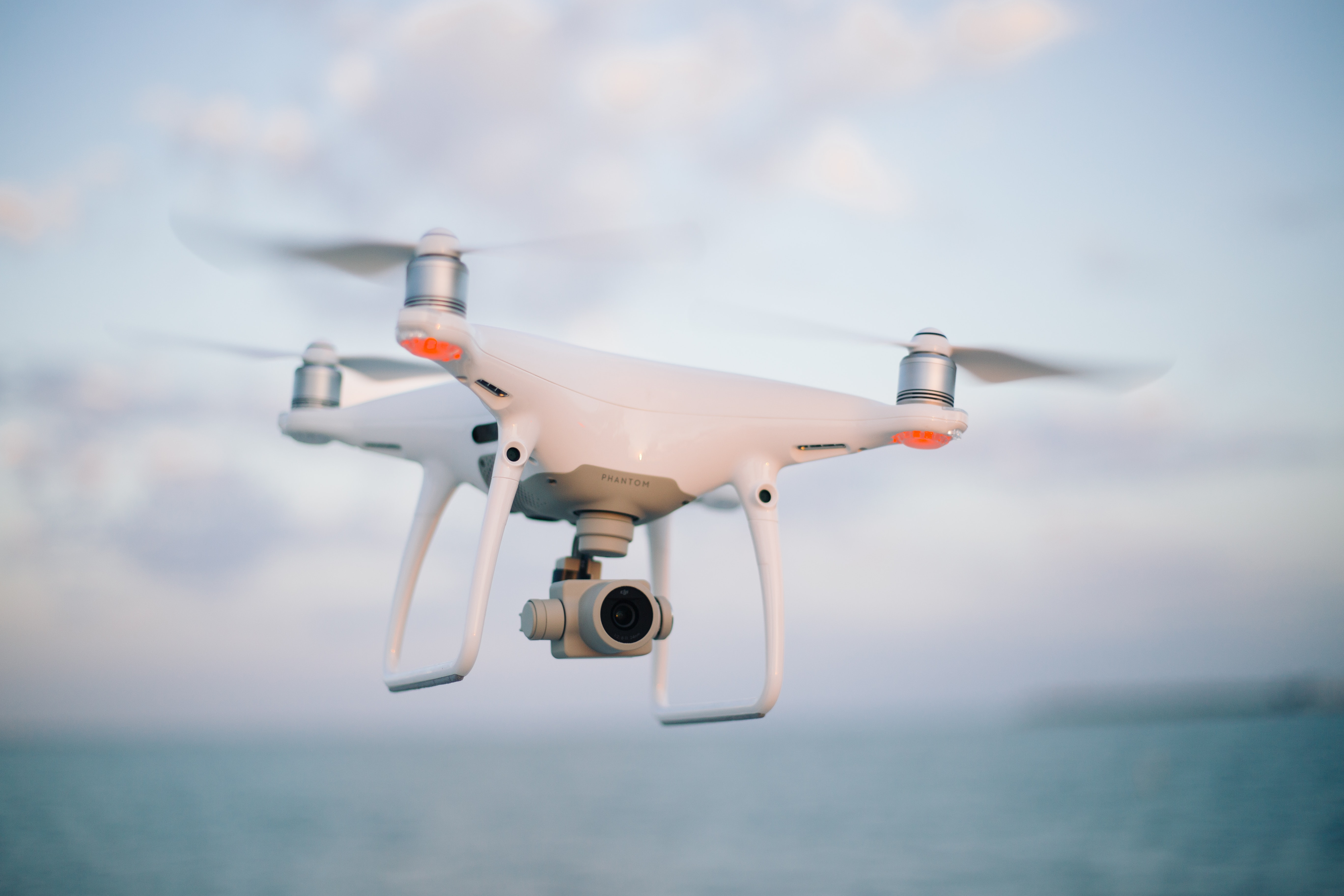
A DJI Phantom quadcopter drone in flight

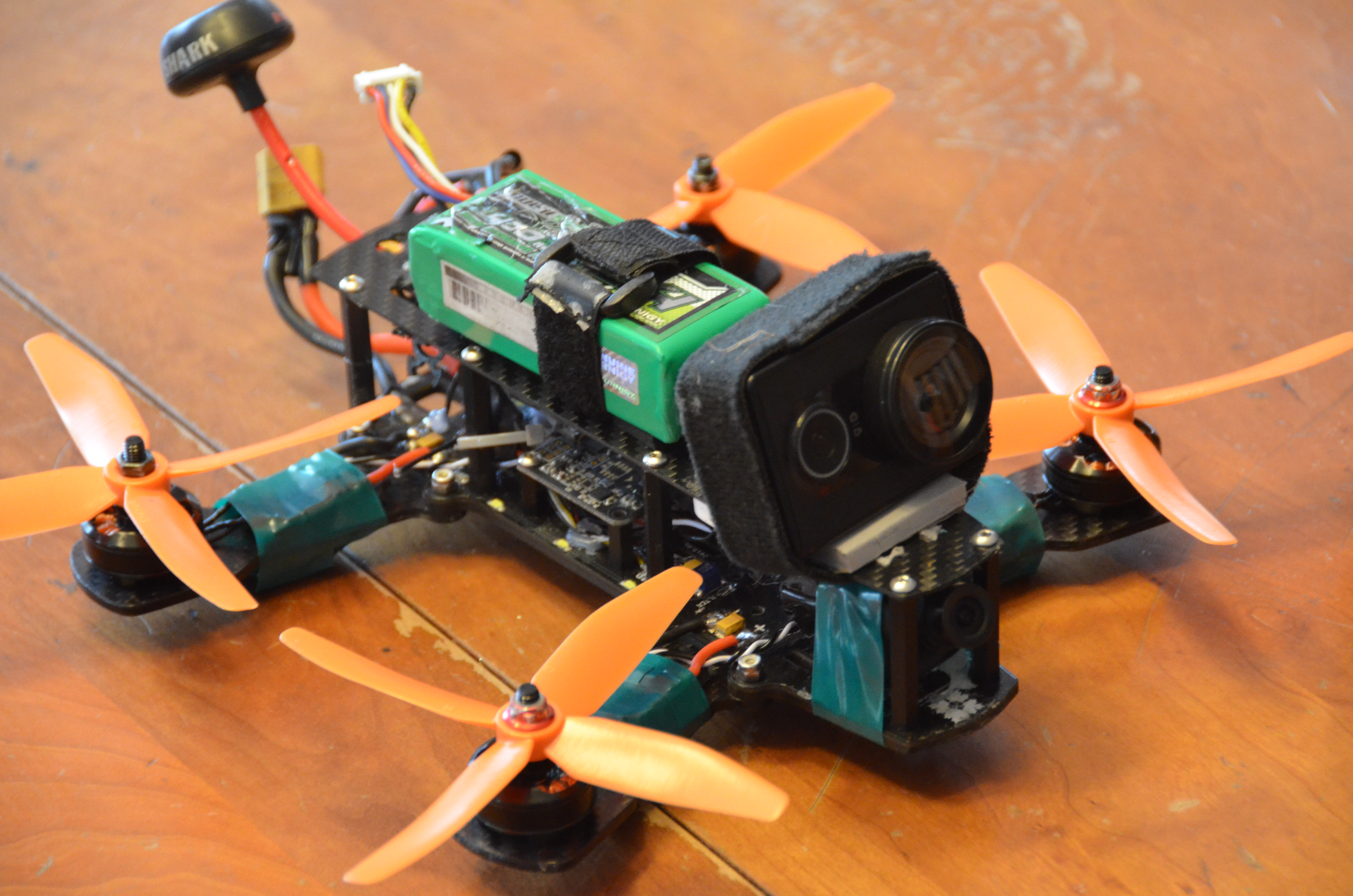
Typical racing quadcopter with carbon fiber frame and FPV camera

A quadcopter, also called quadrocopter, or quadrotor is a type of helicopter or multicopter that has four rotors.

Although quadrotor helicopters and convertiplanes have long been flown experimentally, the configuration remained a curiosity until the arrival of the modern unmanned aerial vehicle or drone. The small size and low inertia of drones allows use of a particularly simple flight control system, which has greatly increased the practicality of the small quadrotor in this application.

== Design principles ==
Each rotor produces both lift and torque about its center of rotation, as well as drag opposite to the vehicle's direction of flight.

Quadcopters generally have two rotors spinning clockwise (CW) and two counterclockwise (CCW). Flight control is provided by independent variation of the speed and hence lift and torque of each rotor. Pitch and roll are controlled by varying the net centre of thrust, with yaw controlled by varying the net torque.

Unlike conventional helicopters, quadcopters do not usually have cyclic pitch control, in which the angle of the blades varies dynamically as they turn around the rotor hub. In the early days of flight, quadcopters (then referred to either as quadrotors or simply as helicopters) were seen as a possible solution to some of the persistent problems in vertical flight. Torque-induced control issues (as well as efficiency issues originating from the tail rotor, which generates no useful lift) can be eliminated by counter-rotation, and the relatively short blades are much easier to construct. A number of manned designs appeared in the 1920s and 1930s. These vehicles were among the first successful heavier-than-air vertical take off and landing (VTOL) vehicles. However, early prototypes suffered from poor performance, and latter prototypes required too much pilot work load, due to poor stability augmentation and limited control authority.

=== Torque ===
If all four rotors are spinning at the same angular velocity, with two rotating clockwise and two counterclockwise, the net torque about the yaw axis is zero, which means there is no need for a tail rotor as on conventional helicopters. Yaw is induced by mismatching the balance in aerodynamic torques (i.e., by offsetting the cumulative thrust commands between the counter-rotating blade pairs).

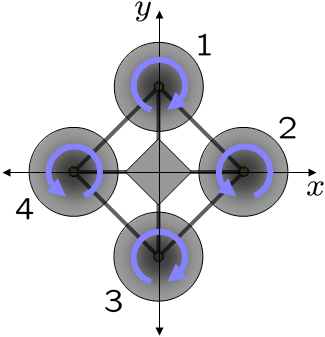
Schematic of reaction torques on each motor of a quadcopter aircraft, due to spinning rotors. Rotors 1 and 3 spin in one direction, while rotors 2 and 4 spin in the opposite direction, yielding opposing torques for control.

A quadrotor hovers or adjusts its altitude by applying equal thrust to all four rotors.

A quadrotor adjusts its yaw by applying more thrust to rotors rotating in one direction.

A quadrotor adjusts its pitch or roll by applying more thrust to one rotor (or two adjacent rotors) and less thrust to the diametrically opposite rotor.

=== Vortex ring state ===
All quadcopters are subject to normal rotorcraft aerodynamics, including the vortex ring state.

=== Mechanical structure ===
The main mechanical components are a fuselage or frame, the four rotors (either fixed-pitch or variable-pitch), and motors. For best performance and simplest control algorithms, the motors and propellers are equidistant.

=== Coaxial rotors ===
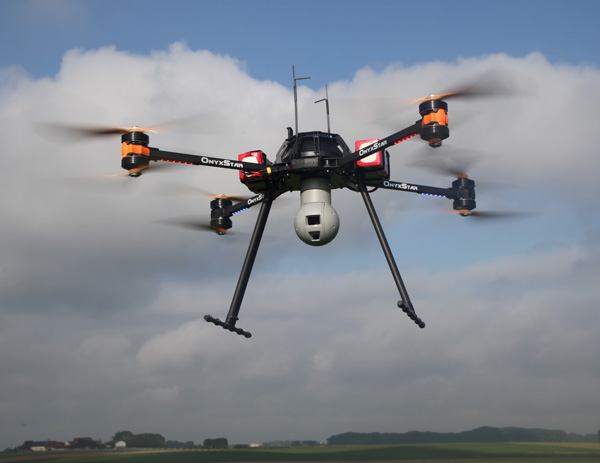
Quadcopter coaxial – OnyxStar FOX-C8 XT Observer from AltiGator

In order to allow more power and stability at reduced weight, a quadcopter, like any other multirotor can employ a coaxial rotor configuration. In this case, each arm has two motors running in opposite directions (one facing up and one facing down).

== Operations ==
=== Autonomous flight ===
The quadcopter configuration is relatively simple to program for autonomous flight. This has allowed experiments with complex swarming behaviour based on basic sensing of the adjacent drones.

== Records ==
=== Endurance ===
The longest flight time achieved by a battery-powered quadcopter was 2 hours, 31 minutes and 30 seconds. The record was set by Ferdinand Kickinger of Germany in 2016. In setting the record, Kickinger used low discharge-rate, high-capacity lithium-ion batteries and stripped the airframe of non-essential weight to reduce power draw and extend endurance.

Alternative power sources like hydrogen fuel cells and hybrid gas-electric generators have been used to dramatically extend endurance because of the increased energy density of both hydrogen and gasoline, respectively.

=== Speed ===
The fastest speed achieved by a quadcopter is 685 km/h (426 mph) by Benjamin Biggs and Aidan Kelly in Australia on 20 May 2026.

The progression of the Guinness World Record is shown below. A record is done by taking the average of two 100m runs in level flight. The two runs must be done in opposing directions to account for wind.

Speed	Date	Pilot(s)	Location	Notes / References
685 km/h (426 mph)	20 May 2026	Benjamin Biggs and Aidan Kelly	Australia	Unofficial record
657.59 km/h (408.61 mph)	11 Dec 2025	Luke and Mike Bell	South Africa	Current official Guinness record
626.42 km/h (389.24 mph)	8 Dec 2025	Benjamin Biggs and Aidan Kelly	Australia	
580.00 km/h (360.40 mph)	22 Jun 2025	Dubai Police; Luke and Mike Bell	United Arab Emirates	
557.64 km/h (346.50 mph)	28 Feb 2025	Samuele Gobbi	Switzerland	
480.23 km/h (298.40 mph)	21 Apr 2024	Luke and Mike Bell	South Africa	
360.50 km/h (224.00 mph)	8 Nov 2022	Ryan Lademann	United States	

== History ==
=== Pioneers ===
The first heavier-than-air aerodyne to take off vertically was a four-rotor helicopter designed by Louis Breguet. It was tested only in tethered flight and to an altitude of a few feet. In 1908 it was reported as having flown 'several times', although details are sparse.

Etienne Oehmichen experimented with rotorcraft designs in the 1920s. Among the designs he tried was the Oehmichen No. 2, which employed four two-blade rotors and eight propellers, all driven by a single engine. The angle of the rotor blades could be varied by warping. Five of the propellers, spinning in the horizontal plane, stabilized the machine laterally. Another propeller was mounted at the nose for steering. The remaining pair of propellers functioned as its forward propulsion. The aircraft exhibited a considerable degree of stability and increase in control-accuracy for its time, and made over a thousand test flights during the middle 1920s. By 1923 it was able to remain airborne for several minutes at a time, and on April 14, 1924, it established the first-ever FAI distance record for helicopters of 360 m (390 yd). It demonstrated the ability to complete a circular course and later, it completed the first 1 kilometre (0.62 mi) closed-circuit flight by a rotorcraft.

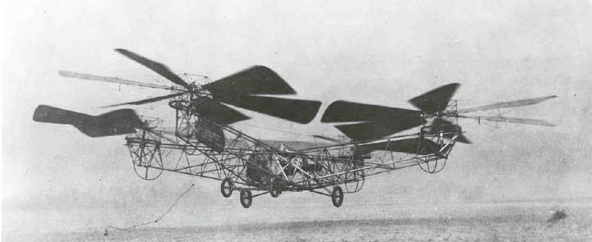
de Bothezat helicopter, 1923 photo

Dr. George de Bothezat and Ivan Jerome developed the de Bothezat helicopter, with six-bladed rotors at the end of an X-shaped structure. Two small propellers with variable pitch were used for thrust and yaw control. The vehicle used collective pitch control. Built by the United States Army Air Service, it made its first flight in October 1922. About 100 flights were made by the end of 1923. The highest it ever reached was about 5 m (16 ft 5 in). Although demonstrating feasibility, it was underpowered, unresponsive, mechanically complex and susceptible to reliability problems. Pilot workload was too high during hover to attempt lateral motion.

=== Postwar era ===
The Convertawings Model A Quadrotor was intended to be the prototype for a line of much larger civil and military helicopters. The design featured two engines driving four rotors through a system of v belts. No tail rotor was needed and control was obtained by varying the thrust between rotors. Flown many times from 1956, this helicopter proved the quadrotor design and it was also the first four-rotor helicopter to demonstrate successful forward flight. Due to a lack of orders for commercial or military versions however, the project was terminated. Convertawings proposed a Model E that would have a maximum weight of 42,000 lb (19 t) with a payload of 10,900 lb (4.9 t) over 300 miles and at up to 173 mph (278 km/h). The Hanson Elastic Articulated (EA) bearingless rotor grew out of work done in the early 1960s at Lockheed California by Thomas F. Hanson, who had previously worked at Convertawings on the quadrotor's rotor design and control system.

The Gloster Crop Sprayer project of 1960 was an early example of a quadcopter drone. To be powered by a 105 hp Potez 4E air-cooled flat four-cylinder engine, its 20 gal payload was discharged through a 22 ft spray boom. Two operators carried homing beacons at opposite ends of the spray run, so that the quadcopter would always home in on a beacon and not overshoot. However, despite the much simplified design and operational requirements compared to a piloted machine, the parent company board refused to develop it and it remained a paper project.

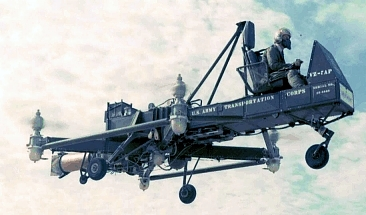
Curtiss-Wright VZ-7

The Curtiss-Wright VZ-7 of 1958 was a VTOL aircraft designed by Curtiss-Wright in competition for the U.S. Army Transport and Research Command "flying jeep". The VZ-7 was controlled by changing the thrust of each of the four ducted fan rotors.

The Piasecki PA-97 was a proposal for a large hybrid aircraft in which four helicopter fuselages were combined with a lighter-than-air airship in the 1980s.

=== Recent developments ===
The Bell Boeing Quad TiltRotor concept takes the fixed quadcopter concept further by combining it with the tilt rotor concept for a proposed C-130 sized military transport.

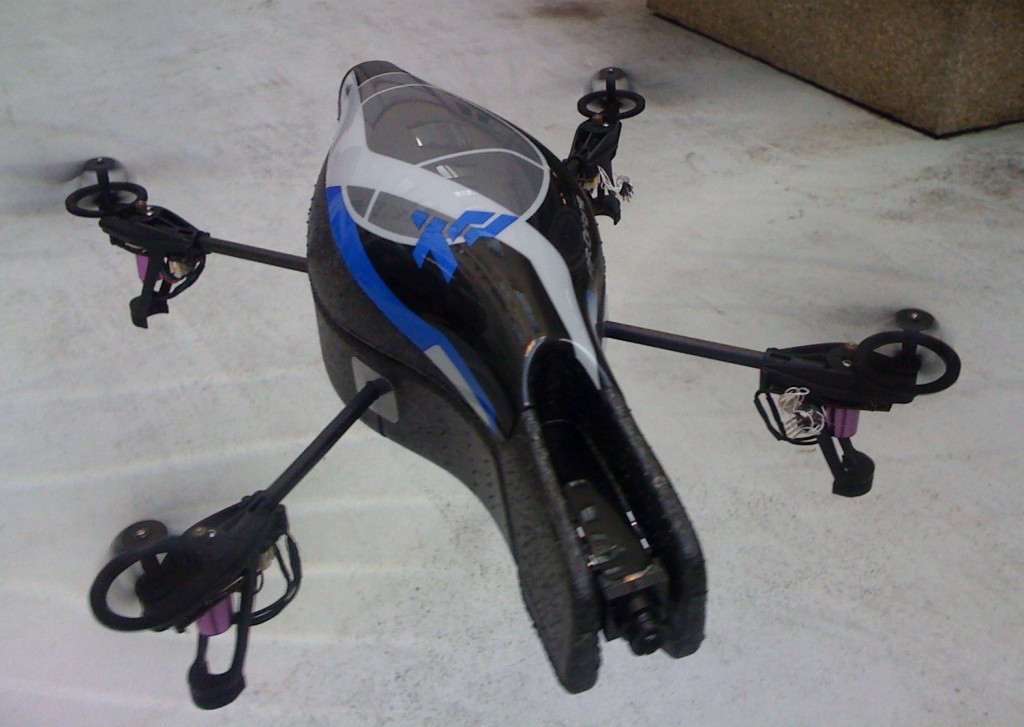
Flying prototype of the Parrot AR.Drone

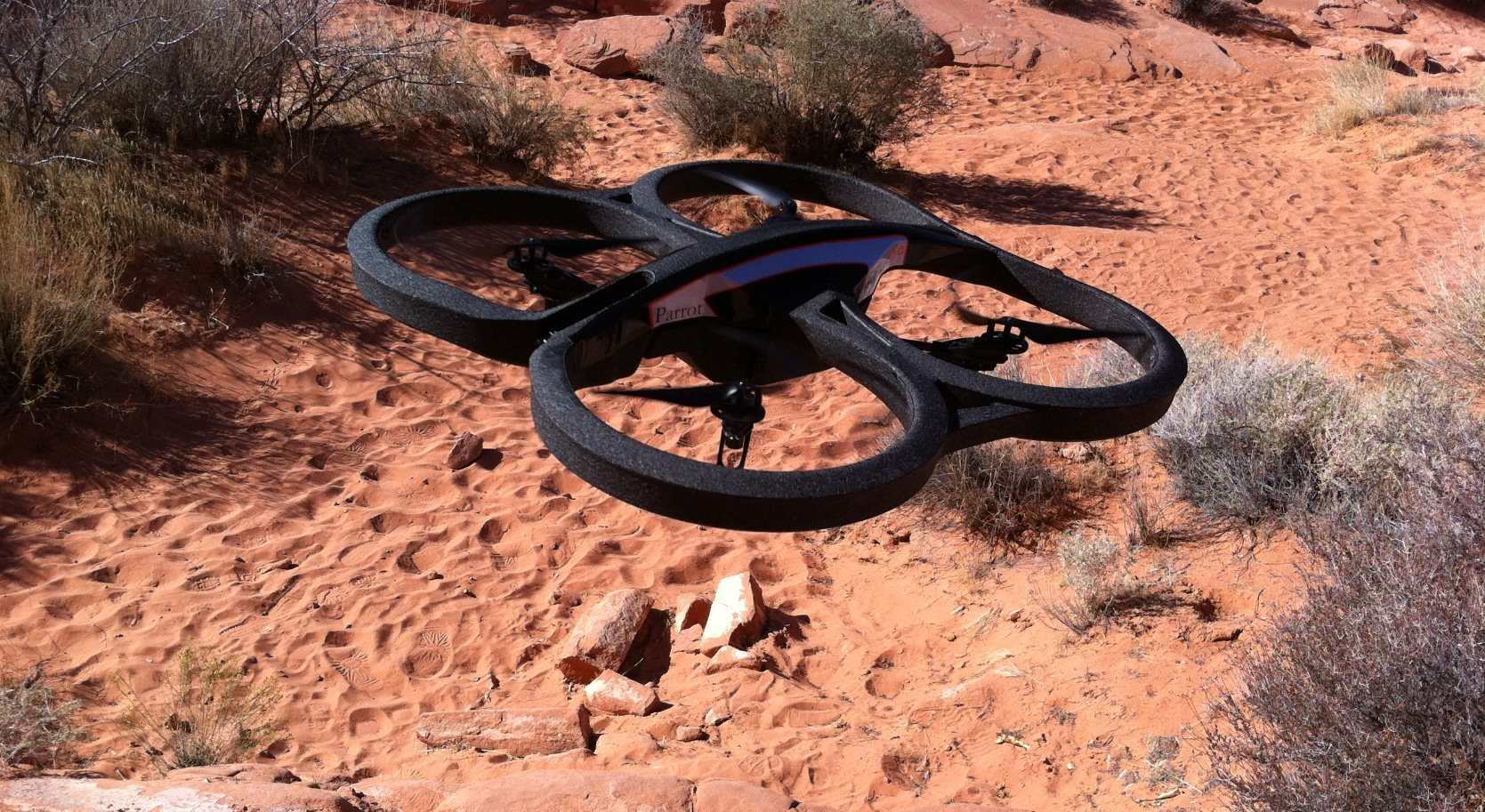
Parrot AR.Drone 2.0 take-off, Nevada, 2012

Airbus is developing a battery-powered quadcopter to act as an urban air taxi, at first with a pilot but potentially autonomous in the future.

=== Drones ===
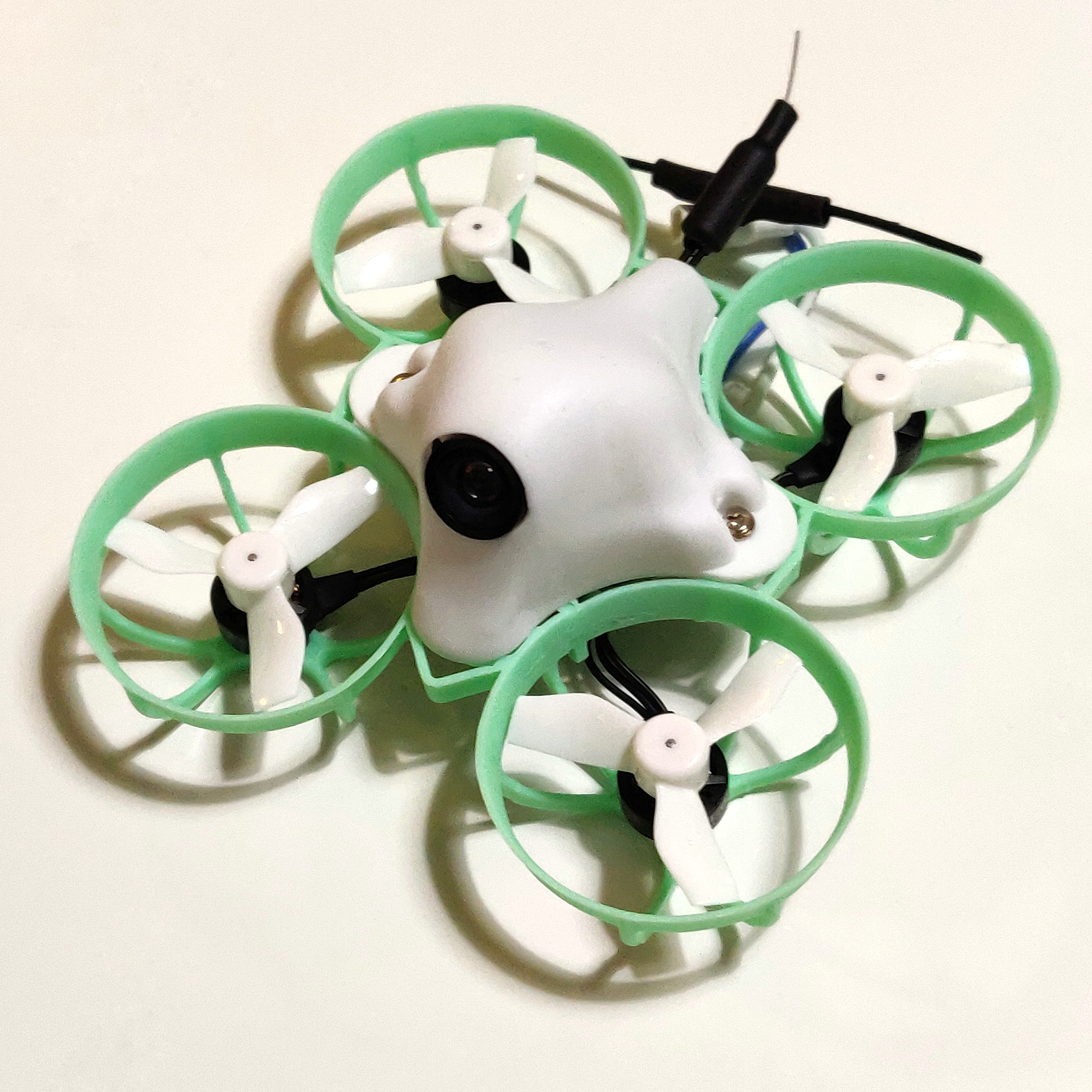
FPV "whoop" drones can be as light as 30 grams

In the first decades of the 2000s, the quadcopter layout has become popular for small-scale unmanned aerial vehicles or drones. The need for aircraft with greater maneuverability and hovering ability has led to a rise in quadcopter research. The four-rotor design allows quadcopters to be relatively simple in design yet highly reliable and maneuverable. Research is continuing to increase the abilities of quadcopters by making advances in multi-craft communication, environment exploration, and maneuverability. If these developing qualities can be combined, quadcopters would be capable of advanced autonomous missions that are currently not possible with other vehicles.

While small toy remote-controlled quadcopters were produced in Japan already in the early 1990s, the first one with a camera to be produced in significant quantities (Draganflyer Stabilized Aerial Video System, retrospectively also Draganflyer I, by Canadian start-up Draganfly) was not designed until 1999.

Around 2005 to 2010, advances in electronics allowed the production of cheap lightweight flight controllers, accelerometers (IMU), global positioning system and cameras. This resulted in the quadcopter configuration becoming popular for small unmanned aerial vehicles. With their small size and maneuverability, these quadcopters can be flown indoors as well as outdoors.

For small drones, quadcopters are cheaper and more durable than conventional helicopters due to their mechanical simplicity. Their smaller blades are also advantageous because they possess less kinetic energy, reducing their ability to cause damage. For small-scale quadcopters, this makes the vehicles safer for close interaction. It is also possible to fit quadcopters with guards that enclose the rotors, further reducing the potential for damage. However, as size increases, fixed propeller quadcopters develop disadvantages relative to conventional helicopters. Increasing blade size increases their momentum. This means that changes in blade speed take longer, which negatively impacts control. Helicopters do not experience this problem as increasing the size of the rotor disk does not significantly impact the ability to control blade pitch.

Due to their ease of construction and control, quadcopters are popular as amateur model aircraft projects.

==== Military use ====
Recreational and commercial drones started to be used, initially by Ukrainian armed forces and then by Russian forces, in the 2022 Russian invasion on Ukraine, initially to compensate for lack of aerial and satellite reconnaissance, and then increasingly as small bombers and loitering munitions on a scale that was described as "game changer".

==== Criminal activity ====
Throughout the 21st century, there have been reported cases of quadcopter drones being used for criminal activity. Due to the construction of the Mexico–United States border wall, some drug cartels have resorted to the use of quadcopters to smuggle drugs. However, quadcopter drones do not necessarily only smuggle drugs across the border, but there are also cases where weapons and other prohibited items are smuggled into prisons around the world.

Quadcopter drone crime is also occurring in Europe. In August 2021, a police officer in the Czech Republic seized a quadcopter that was transporting a sachet of methamphetamine.

== See also ==
- eVTOL
- AeroVelo Atlas
- Human-powered helicopter
- Modular design
- List of quadcopters
