= Surveillance aircraft =

Aircraft designed for sustained observation

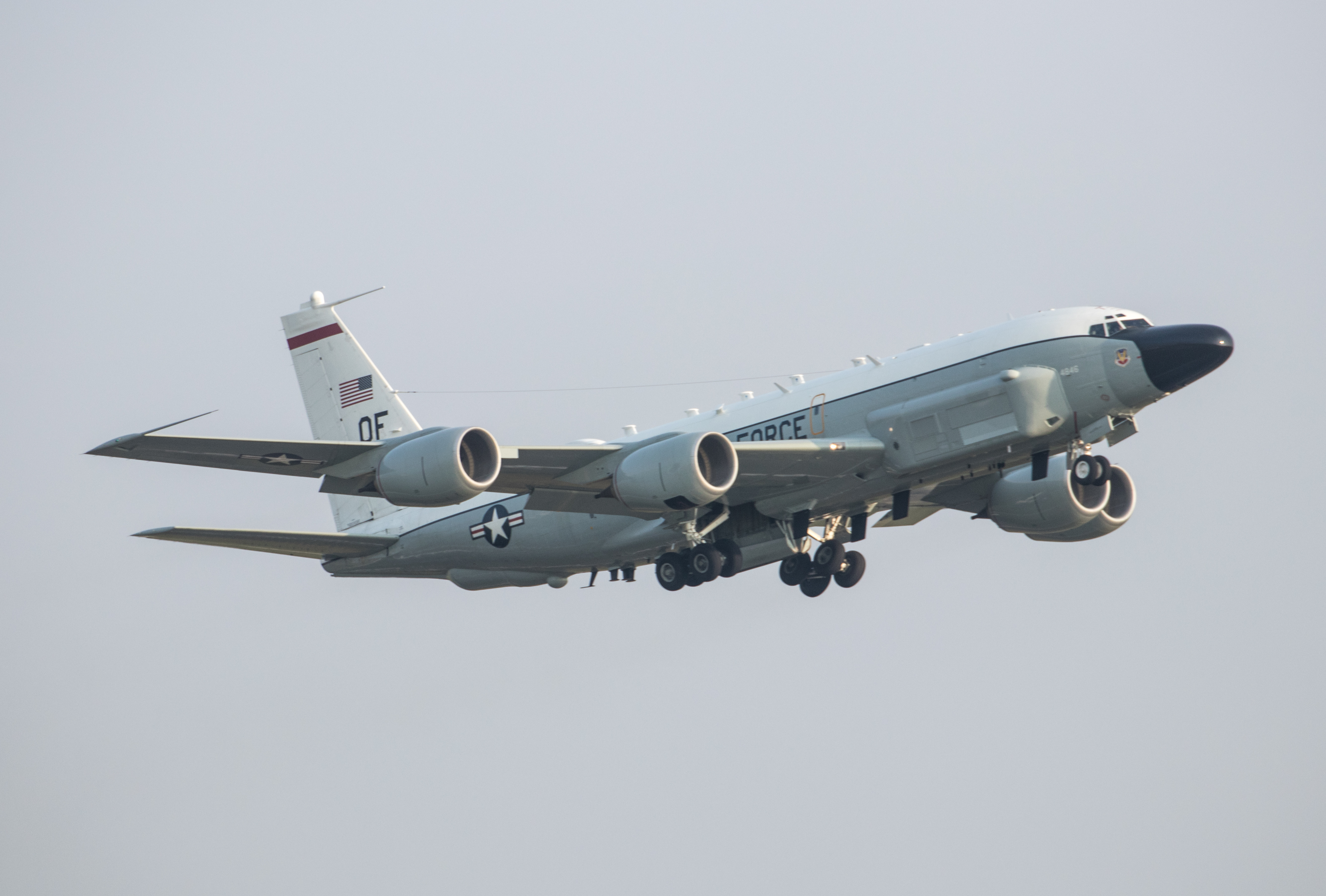
The Boeing RC-135 is a major airborne signal intelligence platform of the United States Air Force.

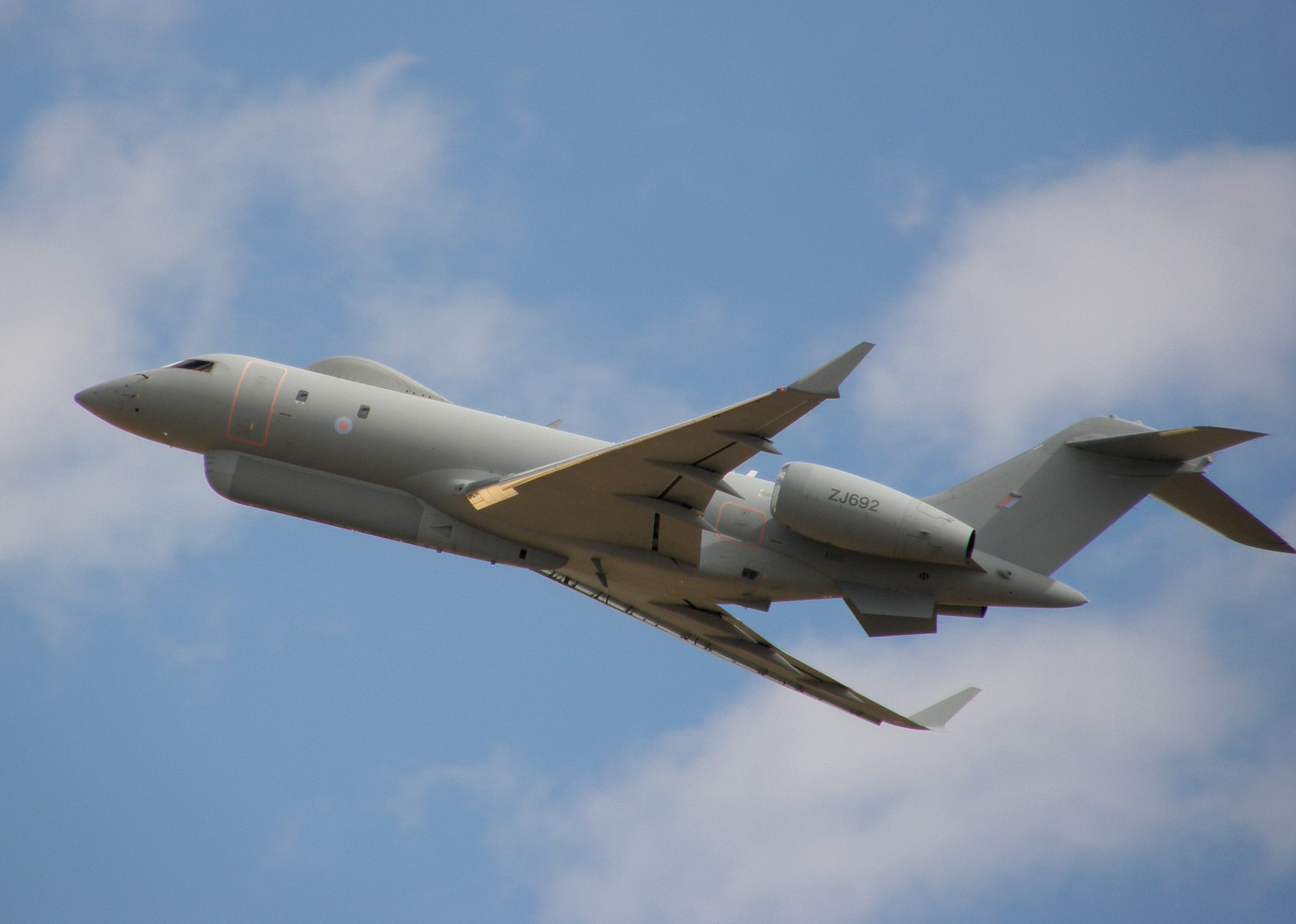
A Raytheon Sentinel of the RAF showing its radar pod

Surveillance aircraft or observation aircraft are aircraft used for aerial surveillance. They are primarily operated by military forces and government agencies in roles including intelligence gathering, maritime patrol, battlefield and airspace surveillance, observation (e.g. artillery spotting), and law enforcement.

Surveillance aircraft usually carry limited defensive armament, if any. They do not require high-performance capability or stealth characteristics and may be modified civilian aircraft. Surveillance aircraft have also included moored balloons (e.g. TARS) and unmanned aerial vehicles (UAVs).

== History ==
=== Pre World War I ===
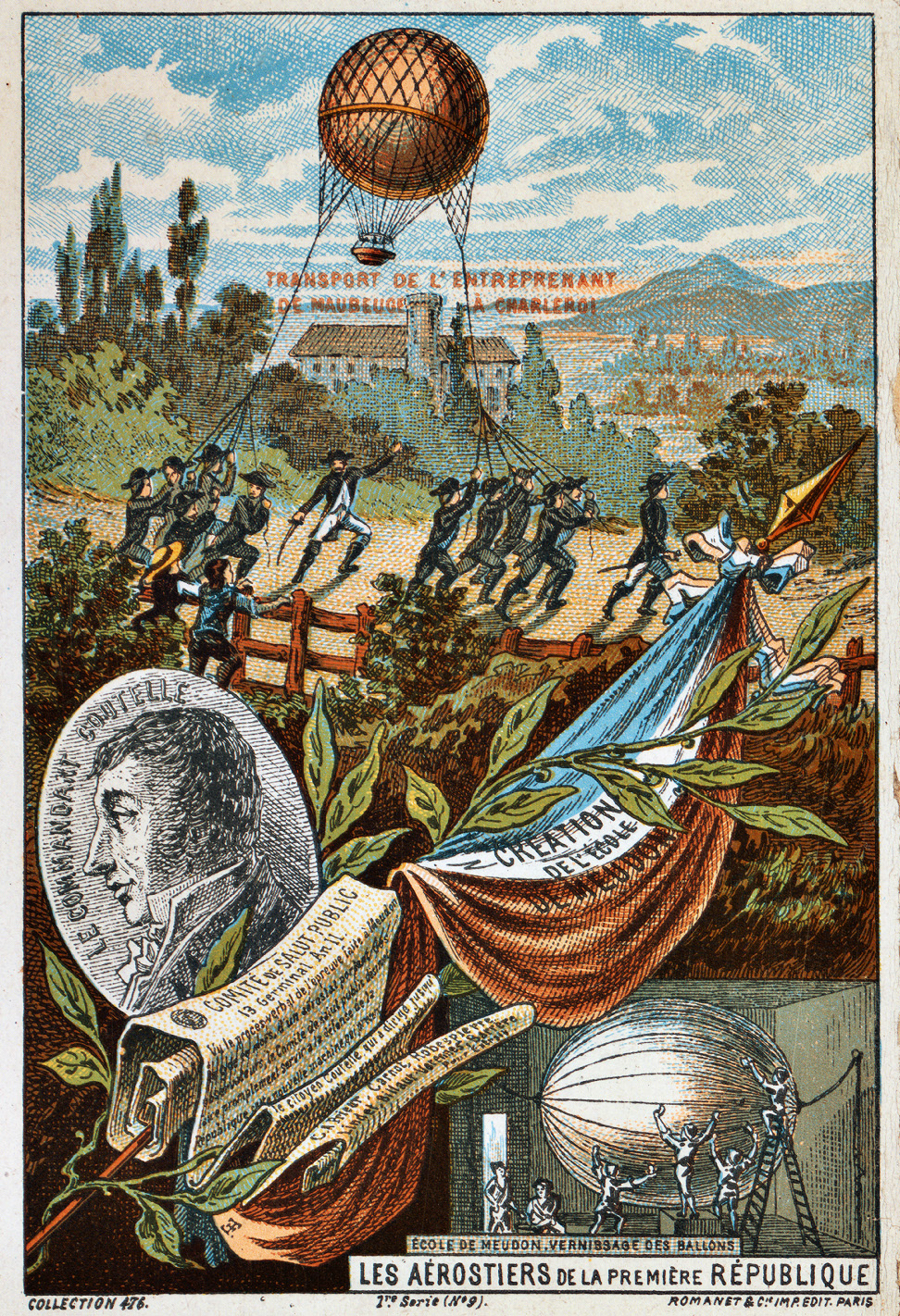
The first surveillance balloon, "l'Entreprenant", 1794

The French were the first to adopt hydrogen-filled balloons on the battlefield for reconnaissance. In the early 1790s, the French would deploy a hydrogen-filled balloon that held two soldiers: one who possessed a telescope, and the other would relay information to troops on the ground. These balloons did not cross into enemy lines; they were deployed on friendly lines for the purpose of surveillance from a higher point of view. These balloons formed the first air force in 1794, which was referred to as the Compagnie d'Aéronautiers. Also in 1794, during the Battle of Fleurus, the French Aerostatic Corps balloon L'Entreprenant remained afloat for nine hours. French officers used the balloon to observe the movements of the Austrian Army, dropping notes to the ground for collection by the French Army and also signaled messages using semaphores.

This method of surveillance would eventually be adopted by the Union Army in the Civil War. American inventor Thadeus Low proposed this invention to President Abraham Lincoln, to which a similar idea would be adopted. The Union Army would use balloons that could hold as many as five soldiers, and they would use telegraphs to relay information.

In the 1880s, a British meteorologist named Douglas Archibald experimented with unmanned surveillance vehicles. Douglas rigged cameras to a kite and used a long cable attached to the kite's string to activate the shutter. This invention would eventually catch the eyes of American Army corporal William Eddy.

During the Spanish-American War of 1898, Eddy adopted his own version of Archibald's kite-mounted camera. Eddy's kite was responsible for creating the first-ever military aerial surveillance photos.

=== World War I ===
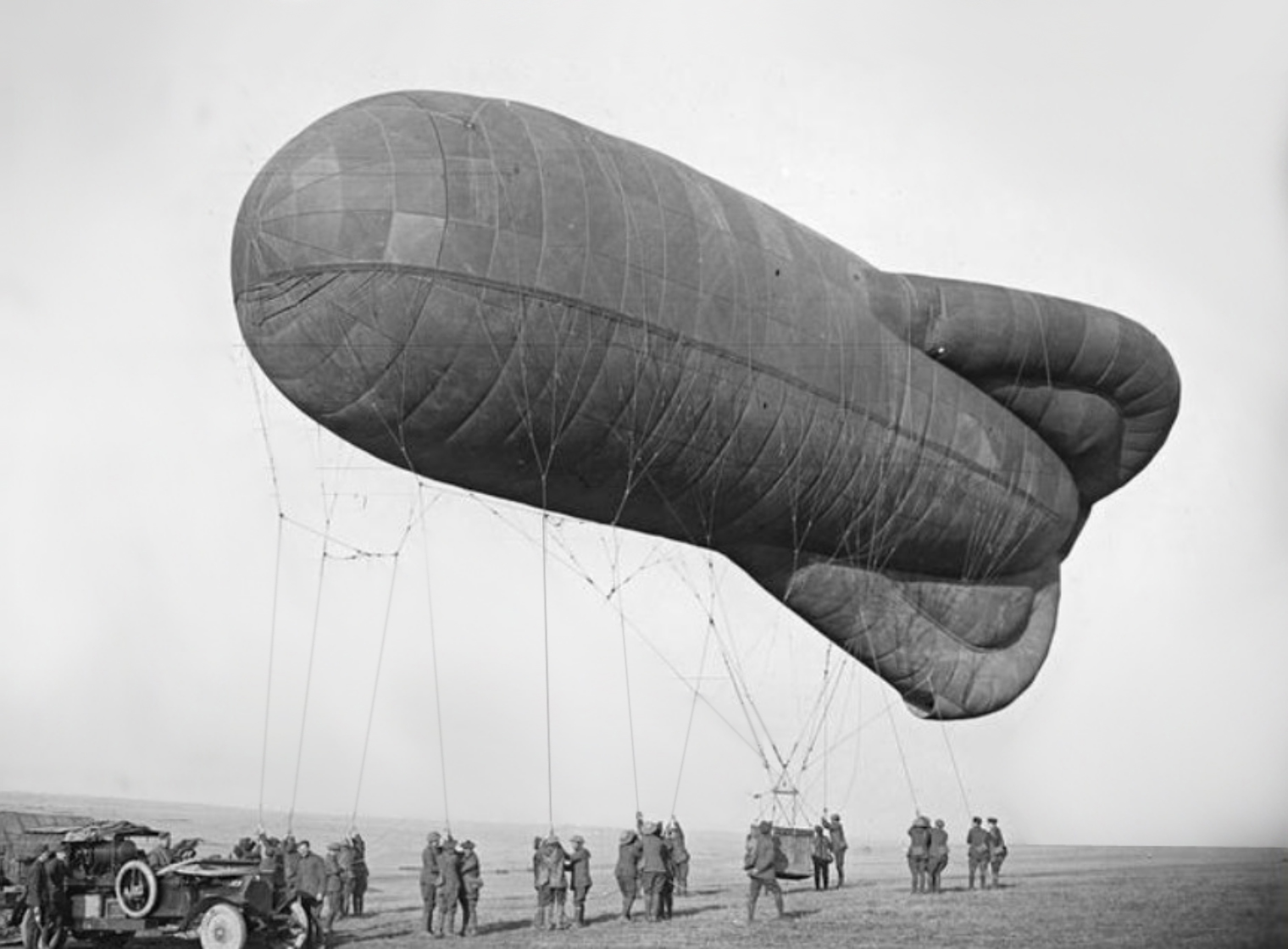
A Royal Flying Corps observation balloon on the Western Front, during World War I

One of the first aircraft used for surveillance was the Rumpler Taube during World War I, when aviators like Fred Zinn evolved entirely new methods of reconnaissance and photography. The translucent wings of the plane made it very difficult for ground-based observers to detect a Taube at an altitude above 400 m. The French also called this plane "the Invisible Aircraft", and it is sometimes also referred to as the "world's very first stealth plane". German Taube aircraft were able to detect the advancing Russian army during the Battle of Tannenberg (1914).

Aircraft were initially used for reconnaissance missions. The pilots of these initial aircraft would track the movement of enemy troops using photographs. These photos would be used to understand enemy formations and create maps that would eventually be used by infantry. By 1916, these aircraft would assist in the spotting of artillery, and the guidance and coordination of infantry. These aircraft forced enemy troops to camouflage their position to hide from aerial observation.

Eventually, surveillance aircraft would be highly valued due to commander's reliance on their information. However, surveillance aircraft would fly a low, slow, and predictable flight path, and with the introduction of aerial combat, surveillance aircraft were an easy target.

=== World War II ===
Pre-war, the British built and flew two Fleet Shadower aircraft, including the General Aircraft Fleet Shadower, that could follow and observe the enemy fleet at a distance. However, they were made obsolete by the 1940s with the introduction of airborne radar.

By 1940, U.S. aerial observation efforts were limited to a few National Guard squadrons, who primarily used the obsolescent North American O-47. By 1944, the United States Army Air Forces had at least three full tactical reconnaissance groups that were supporting ground units.

Air observation posts were developed during World War II. Light aircraft such as the Auster were used by the British Royal Artillery for artillery spotting. By the mid-1960s, air observation was generally taken over by light observation helicopters.

=== Cold War ===
Spy flights were a source of major contention between the United States and the Soviet Union during most of the 1960s. Due to the difficulty of surveillance in the USSR, US policymakers established the National Reconnaissance Office. To combat this difficulty of surveillance, the US military developed the U2. This aircraft could fly at altitudes of 70,000 feet to avoid detection from KGB surveillance. The U2 was also equipped with a Hycon 73B camera. This camera was capable of capturing details as small as 2.5 feet wide. In 1962, a U2 captured images that discovered nuclear missiles in Cuba. These photos would initiate what is known as the Cuban Missile Crisis.

Aerial Reconnaissance was dangerous: Out of 152 cryptologists who died in the Cold War, 64 of them were participating in aerial reconnaissance missions. During the time period of 1945–1977, more than forty reconnaissance aircraft were shot down in the European and Pacific areas.

The US Military originally used standard aircraft like B-29s for reconnaissance missions. Eventually, variants of the aircraft were designed for reconnaissance, e.g. the C-130 and RC-130. These repurposed aircraft were sometimes referred to as “ferret” aircraft, and intelligence personnel commanding these aircraft were nicknamed “backenders”.

The United States also performed surveillance using repurposed Ryan Firebee unmanned target drones. Variants of these vehicles, designated the Model 147, could fly for 2500 miles.

In May 1991, the Department of the Navy reported that at least one UAV was airborne at all times during Operation Desert Storm.

=== War on terror ===
During the global war on terror, the US military developed defenses to surveillance aircraft to combat surveillance use. The United States military used precision cameras, drones that detect drones, and direct-energy weapons that disrupt control links and GPS navigation.

== Roles ==
=== Maritime patrol ===
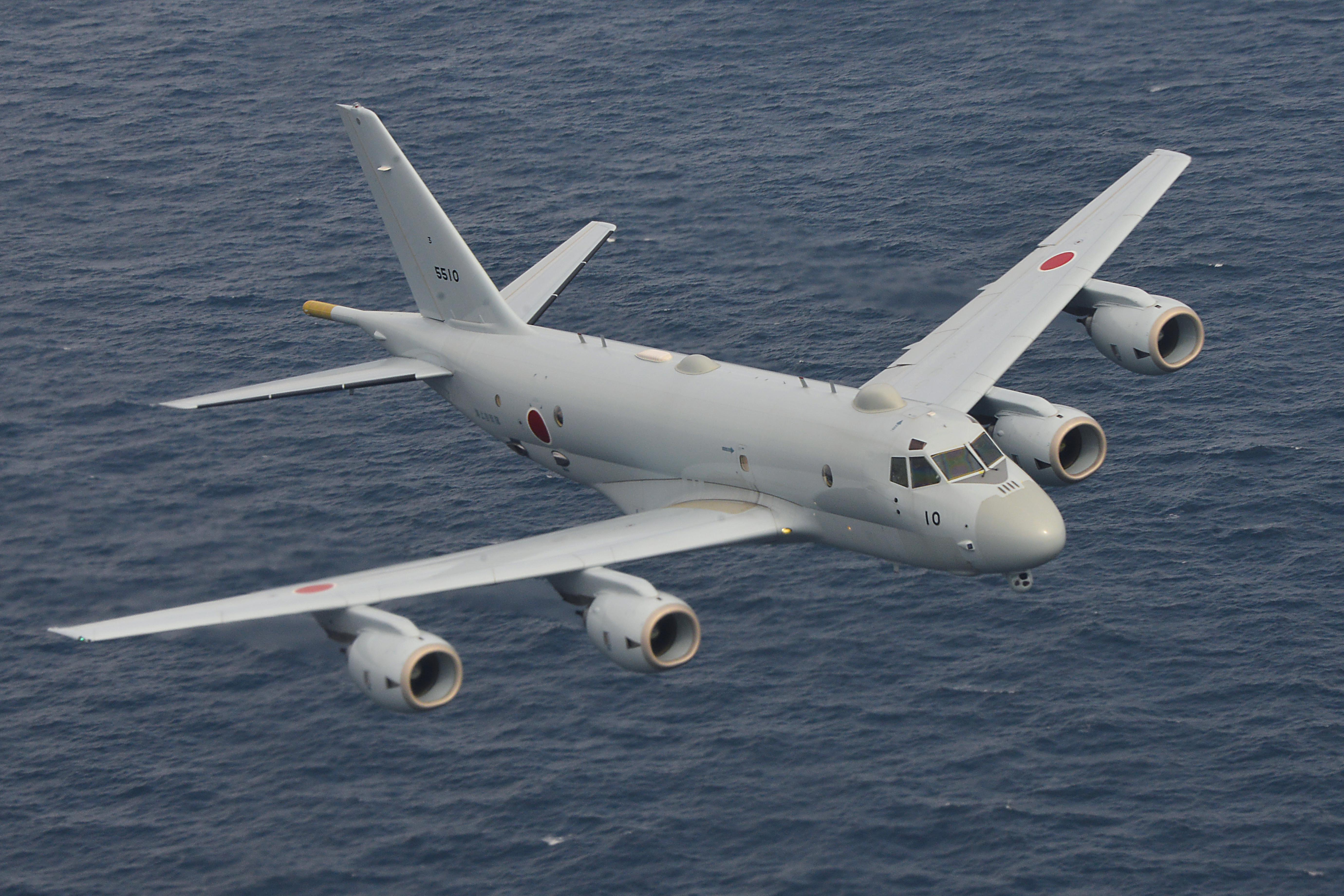
A Kawasaki P-1 maritime patrol and anti-submarine aircraft.

The main components of maritime surveillance consist of sightings from ship captains and aircraft pilots. However, due to the radar horizon, surveillance aircraft are preferred as they can identify targets hundreds of miles further than vessels. An example of this today is the Coast Guard's use of unmanned aerial systems (UASs) to improve their capabilities while reducing the risk for service members. Currently, the Coast Guard has roughly 250 drone certified officers across the US. The main uses of UASs within maritime activities are search and rescue operations and responding to different environmental disasters. The Coast Guard's use of unmanned drones specifically led them to creating an “Unmanned Systems Strategic Plan.” This plan would expand the use of current aerial surveillance systems to new challenges such as drug trafficking surveillance, migrant interdiction, and ice operations. With regards to environmental tasks, UASs will be expanded to address marine safety, fishing activity, and navigational uses. The Coast Guard outlines the future of aerial surveillance in maritime patrol as improving current UAS systems, integrating improved sensors and AI/ML, and creating more organized command and control plans/operations.

Maritime patrol aircraft are typically large, slow machines capable of flying continuously for many hours, with a wide range of sensors. Such aircraft include the Hawker-Siddeley Nimrod, the Breguet Atlantique, the Tupolev Tu-95, the Lockheed P-2 Neptune and the Lockheed P-3 Orion/CP-140 Aurora. Smaller ship-launched observation seaplanes were used from World War I through World War II.

=== Law enforcement ===
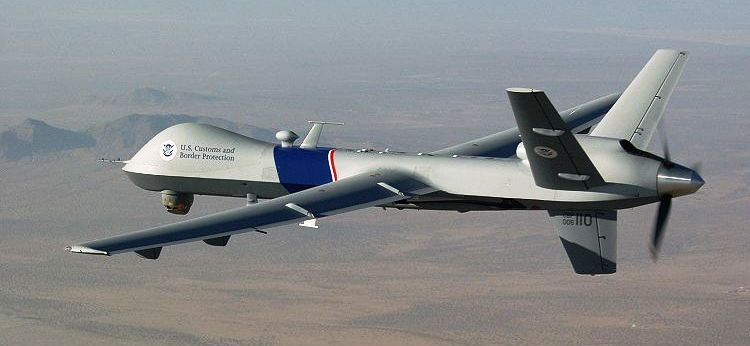
A U.S. Customs and Border Protection MQ-9 Reaper B.

Unmanned aircraft systems (UAS) are being increasingly deployed by U.S. law enforcement agencies. In August 2023, a Congressional Research Service to members of Congress described the multiple uses of these aircraft, including general surveillance and intelligence or evidence gathering. Unmanned surveillance drones can also be used to identify the locations of suspects who may be hiding or analyze the physical layout of a room before officers enter. Furthermore, unmanned surveillance drones can be used by law enforcement to light up large areas where it may be dark and difficult for officers to use traditional means of illumination. There are a few federal laws that apply to the use of unmanned surveillance systems, the Federal Aviation Administration (FAA) currently only has 2 options for the use of this technology by law enforcement. The first is that they can only operate them under 400 feet and need to maintain visual of the aircraft. Second, operators of the aircraft need to receive specific license and certifications to operate them. In response to the few and vague laws, the Department of Justice (DOJ) and Department of Homeland Security (DHS) has created policies to regulate the use and deployment of these drones domestically.

Predator UAVs have been used by the US for border patrol.

== Current military applications ==
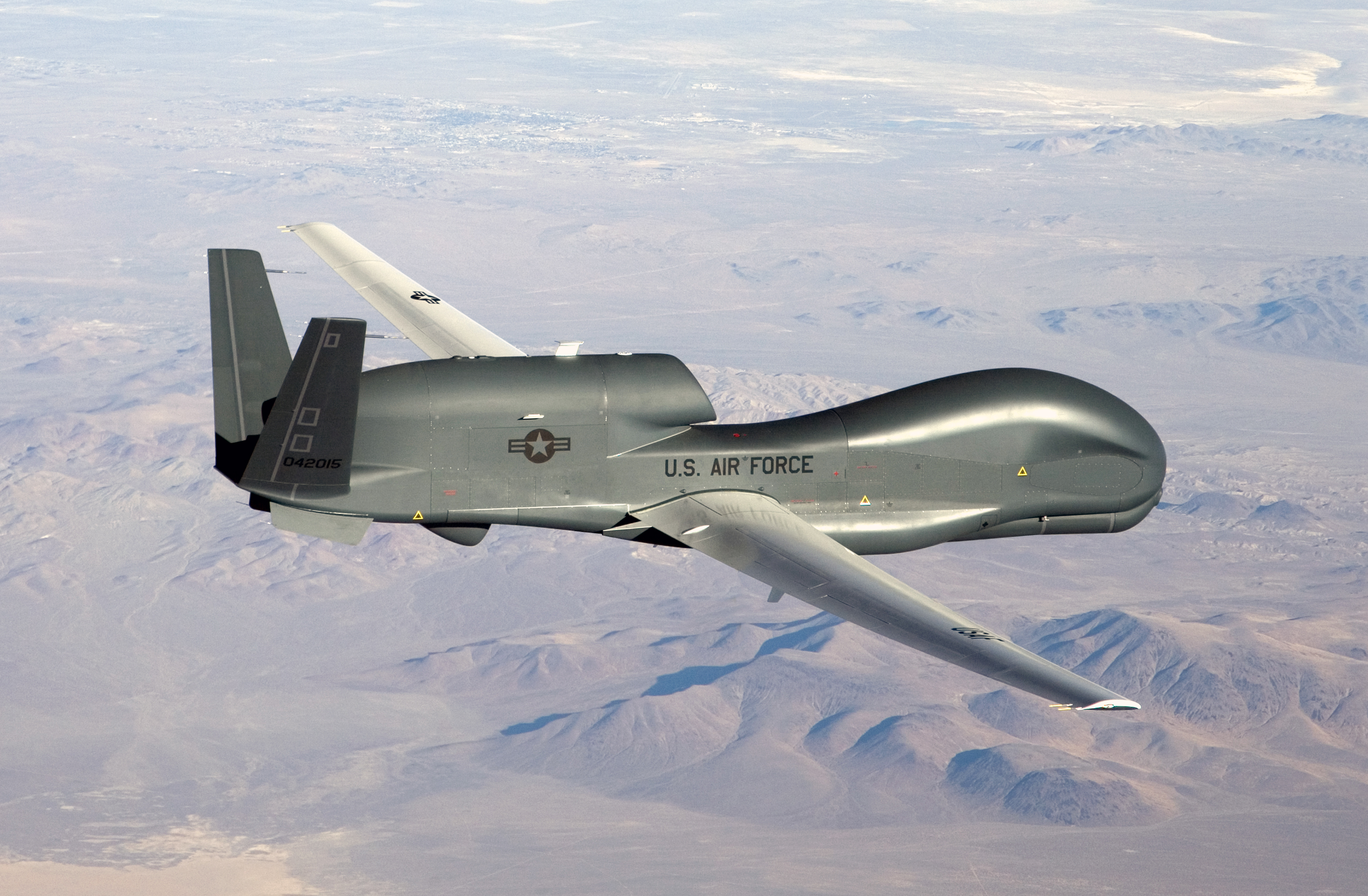
The RQ-4 Global Hawk is a high-altitude, remotely-piloted surveillance UAV.

Unmanned Aerial Vehicle (UAV) surveillance aircraft have been "deployed or are under development in many countries, including Israel, Iran, the UK, the United States, Canada, China, India, South Africa and Pakistan." Most air forces around the world lack dedicated surveillance planes.

Several countries adapt aircraft for electronic intelligence (ELINT) gathering. The Beech RC-12 Super King Air and Boeing RC-135 Rivet Joint are examples of this activity.

Unmanned surveillance UAVs include both airships—such as Sky Sentinel and HiSentinel 80—and airplanes.

=== South China Sea ===
The United States military has flown reconnaissance flights, called sensitive reconnaissance operations (SRO) by the U.S. Air Force, to monitor expansionist developments by the People's Republic of China, North Korea, and Russia in the Indo-Pacific region for decades; however, recent operations in the region have focused on monitoring movements by the People's Republic of China. More than ten different aircraft are used for SRO missions in the theater, including manned aircraft USAF RC-135 Rivet Joint and U-2 Dragon Lady, and the unmanned aircraft RQ-4 Global Hawk. Reconnaissance missions are capable of changing course within minutes to monitor activity and therefore used for reconnaissance missions more often than satellites, which can take hours or days to change position and are vulnerable to anti-satellite weapons.

=== Russian invasion of Ukraine ===
Small unmanned drones have been used by the Ukrainian military to identify enemy units and navigate artillery fire for safer and more efficient attacks on Russian targets, record propaganda videos of ambushes for posting on social media, and document alleged Russian war crimes and damages. Class I and III drone systems, classified by NATO as those of less than 150 kilograms and more than 600 kilograms, respectively, have been the most frequently used in the region. Turkish Bayraktar TB2 military drones have often been utilized by Ukraine in both reconnaissance and strike missions, and both Ukrainian and Russian militaries have used hobby drones donated to them by civilians, such as DJI Mavic mini drones, to conduct surveillance and strikes on enemy troops.

=== Gaza war ===
The United States military had flown MQ-9 Reapers, unmanned aerial vehicles capable of more than 20 consecutive hours of flight, over the Gaza Strip for at least a month after the start of the Gaza war. According to the U.S. Defense Department, flights collected surveillance with the purpose of locating hostages taken by Hamas and finding signs of life, but did not aid the Israeli military on the ground. The British military also carried out flights over Gaza to locate hostages initially using unarmed Shadow R1 aircraft. As of March 2024, the Israeli military conducted hundreds of flight hours and almost 100 sorties in Gaza using the Oron reconnaissance aircraft, previously used as a business jet and upgraded to include advanced sensors and defense systems.

=== Israel-Hezbollah Conflict ===
On June 18, 2024, Hezbollah released drone footage capturing sensitive sites in northern Israel, including military complexes and naval bases around Haifa. This action showcased areas such as the Rafael Military Industries Complex and various naval facilities. Hezbollah's campaign aims to intimidate and threaten Israel by displaying its surveillance capabilities and asserting its ability to penetrate Israeli defenses. This act highlights Hezbollah's growing technological and operational threats against Israel's security.

=== Business aircraft ===
With smaller equipment, long-range business aircraft can be modified in surveillance aircraft to perform specialized missions cost-effectively, from ground surveillance to maritime patrol:

- the 99,500 lb (45,100 kg), 6,000 nmi Bombardier Global 6000 is the platform for the USAF Northrop Grumman E-11A Battlefield Airborne Communications Node, the radar-carrying ground-surveillance Raytheon Sentinel for the UK Royal Air Force, and Saab's GlobalEye AEW&C carrying its Erieye AESA radar as UK's Marshall ADG basis for Elint/Sigint for the United Arab Emirates; it is also the base for the proposed Saab AB Swordfish MPA and the USAF Lockheed Martin J-Stars Recap battlefield-surveillance program, while IAI's ELI-3360 MPA is based on the Global 5000;
- The 91,000 lb (41,000 kg), 6,750 nmi Gulfstream G550 was selected for the IAI EL/W-2085 Conformal Airborne Early Warning AESA radar for Italy, Singapore and Israel (which also has IAI Sigint G550s) while L3 Technologies transfers the U.S. Compass Call electronic-attack system to the G550 CAEW-based EC-37B, like the NC-37B range-support aircraft, and will modify others for Australia's AISREW program, Northrop Grumman proposes the G550 for the J-Stars Recap;
- Dassault Aviation developed the Falcon 900 MPA and Falcon 2000 Maritime Multirole Aircraft for France (which delayed its Avsimar requirement), South Korea and the Japan Coast Guard with a mission system developed with L3 and Thales Group;
- Embraer delivered several EMB-145s as a platform for AEW&C, MPA and multi-intelligence;
- the Beechcraft King Air 350ER is a platform for ISR versions, including L3's Spyder II and Sierra Nevada Corp.'s Scorpion and as the MC-12W for the U.S. Army.

== Current civilian applications ==
Drones are increasingly used in conservation work to complete tasks such as mapping forest cover, tracking wildlife, and enforcing environmental laws by catching illegal loggers or poachers.

=== Monitoring protests ===
Surveillance drones, helicopters, and airplanes were deployed over 15 cities during the 2020 George Floyd protests. Unmanned aircraft were used to track the movements of protestors and to provide aerial views of violent acts and arson. The recorded video was sent to a digital network that could be accessed by various federal agencies and local law enforcement for use in criminal investigations. However, the National Air Security Operations Center stated the drones flew at a height that made it impossible to identify individuals or license plates.

=== Border patrol ===
Surveillance aircraft have recently been used to patrol maritime borders that are much longer than land borders and typically have less personnel. The Schengen Area in the European Union has recently used it to monitor their southern border in the Mediterranean. They gather intelligence including illegal crossings, search and rescue operations, smuggling, and fishing. Belgium has also deployed drones to monitor irregular maritime activity and to find children lost on the beach.

== Ethics and regulations ==
=== Public opinion ===
A 2014 survey from the Pew Center showed that pluralities or majorities of people in 39 of 44 countries oppose American drone strikes in the Middle East. Only in Israel, Kenya, and the USA do at least half of the public support American drone strikes. Additionally, following the Edward Snowden incident, concern within the US is only increasing regarding the government respecting people's privacy and civil liberties. Regarding the use of surveillance drones domestically in the US, the public tends to consider the benefits of this kind of surveillance versus the risks to individual privacy. Findings from an ethical analysis suggest people understand the benefits UAVs contribute to protecting the public while at the same time poses a risk to individual safety. A report from 2014 found 70%-73% of U.S. adults believed government use of surveillance drones was “excessive” and “violates personal privacy.” Subsequently, only 39% believed it “increased public safety” and only 10% believed it was “necessary” for surveillance. Furthermore, the public is more opposed to surveillance drones being in the hands of private individuals and businesses, rather than the government.

=== Applicable law ===
In the U.S., case law holds that airborne surveillance does not violate privacy rights protected under the 14th Amendment of the Constitution, so long as unmanned aircraft systems are not in "general public use". The lack of widespread use of such systems justifies individuals' reasonable expectations of privacy again this type of surveillance.

In the European Union, Article 7 of the Charter of Fundamental Rights of the European Union 2000 provides that people have a right of privacy and Article 8 protects the right to one's individual personal data. Under these provisions, aerial surveillance of public spaces would be lawful but surveillance of one's private home be subject to administrative oversight.

The Regulation of Investigatory Powers Act (RIPA) of 2000 applies to air surveillance in the United Kingdom. RIPA prohibits large-scale and generalized surveillance, and RIPA authorization is required for individualized surveillance of private residences.

== See also ==
- High-Altitude Long Endurance aircraft
- MikroKopter
- Reconnaissance aircraft
- Treaty on Open Skies
- Micro air vehicle
- Wide-area motion imagery
