= Coptercam =

Remotely piloted aircraft

Coptercam is a custom-built, remotely piloted aircraft used for aerial photography, filming and live broadcasting of video.

As a multi-rotor electric unmanned aerial vehicle, it is propelled using eight electric brushless DC motors.

The COPTERCAM 8 aerial camera system

== History ==
Coptercam was founded in 2010 in Austria and used MikroKopter technology.

Coptercam Pty. Ltd., developed the Coptercam as an aerial camera system. The Australian company began in 2011 specifically to create a UAV service for providing aerial photography and filming. In April 2012, the Civil Aviation Safety Authority approved the Coptercam as an Unmanned Aerial System and issued Coptercam Pvt. Ltd. with a UAS Operator Certificate.

== Essential data and performance ==
- Weight (BEW): 1600g (3.5 lb) without batteries
- Battery weight: 715 - 1430g (1.6 - 3.2 lb)
- Max Payload: 2000g (4.4 lb) (inclusive of camera mount)
- MTOW: 5030g (11.1 lb)
- Motors: 8 x brushless DC, 350W (0.5 hp) maximum power, 2200g (4.9 lb) max thrust, 125g (0.3 lb) weight
- Propellers: 12” (30.5 cm)
- Battery: 14.8V. 6600 mAh or 2 x 3300 mAh or 2 x 5000 mAh
- Arm length: 355mm – 435mm (14 - 17.1 in.)
- Total diameter: 1100mm. (43.3 in.)
- Radio control: 2.4 GHz FHSS with telemetry
- Video down-link: 5.8 GHz COFDM
- PC Telemetry link: 900Mhz FHSS
- Endurance: 12 minutes with HD camera and 10% reserve.

== Variants ==
There are two variants of the Coptercam. The major difference between the two variants is the airframe and camera gimbal system.

- The Coptercam 8 AD has a 2 axis stabilized gimbal system which allows for roll and pitch control and stabilization.
- The Coptercam 8 CS has a 3 axis stabilized gimbal system which allows 360 degree pan in addition to roll and pitch stabilization. Due to the extra payload weight, its maximum flight time is reduced to 8 minutes.

== Operational history ==
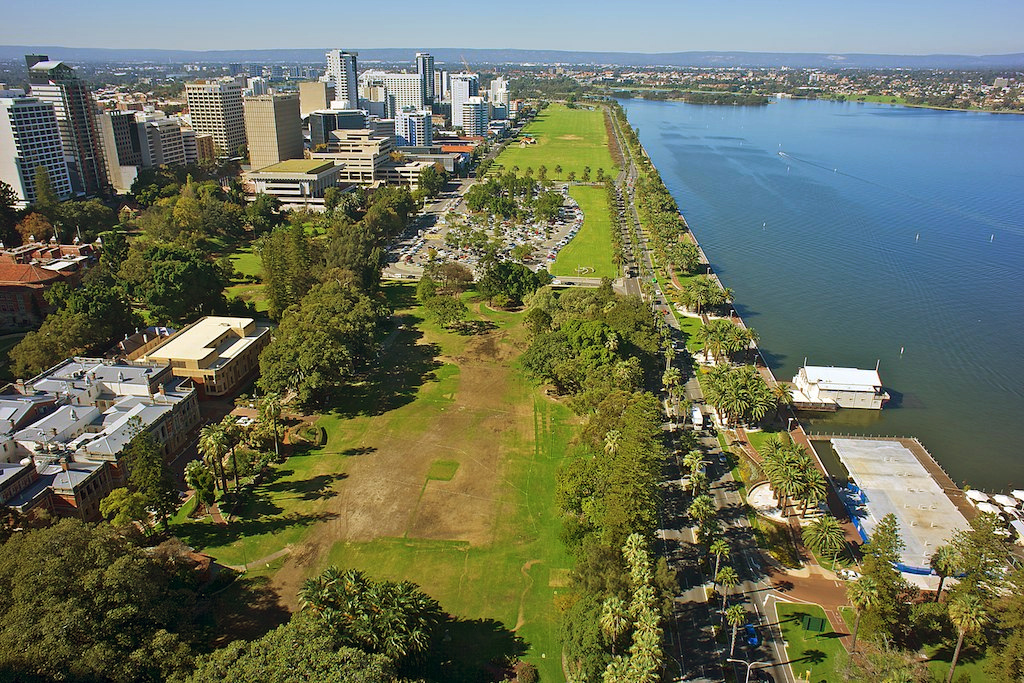
Langley Park, Perth, Western Australia as seen from a COPTERCAM at 120

- In April 2012, the Coptercam was first employed in Western Australia to take photographs of real estate properties for sale.
- In June 2012, Coptercam to survey damage caused by a tornado in Western Australia.
- On 21 December 2012, the Coptercam made headlines at the Melbourne Cricket Ground as the FoxKopter. The Coptercam became the first Unmanned Aerial Vehicle (UAV) or Remotely Piloted Aircraft (RPA) to provide full HD live video broadcast to a television network, and be approved by any civil aviation authority. The Coptercam was extensively used at the Cricket during the T20 Big Bash League 02.
- In 2013, Fox Sports deployed the Coptercam at the National Rugby League, Rip Curl Pro Bells Beach, and the A-League finals.

== On TV ==
Footage captured on a Coptercam:

- Rip Curl Pro - Bells Beach
- Fox Sports NRL

== See also ==
- Skycam
- Steadicam
- Spidercam
