= De Bothezat helicopter =

1922 US Army Air Service helicopter

"Flying Octopus"
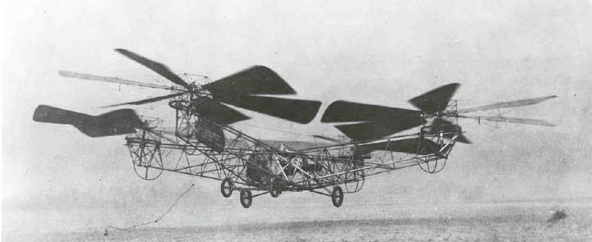

General information
- Type: Experimental rotorcraft
- Manufacturer: George de Bothezat
- Designer: George de Bothezat; Ivan Jerome
- Primary user: U.S. Army Air Service
- Number built: 1

History
- First flight: 18 December 1922
- Retired: 1924

The de Bothezat helicopter, also known as the Jerome-de Bothezat Flying Octopus, was an experimental quadrotor helicopter built for the United States Army Air Service by George de Bothezat in the early 1920s, and was said at the time to be the first successful helicopter. Although its four massive six-bladed rotors allowed the craft to fly successfully, it suffered from complexity, control difficulties, and high pilot workload, and was reportedly only capable of forward flight in a favorable wind. The Army canceled the program in 1924, and the aircraft was scrapped.

== Development and testing ==
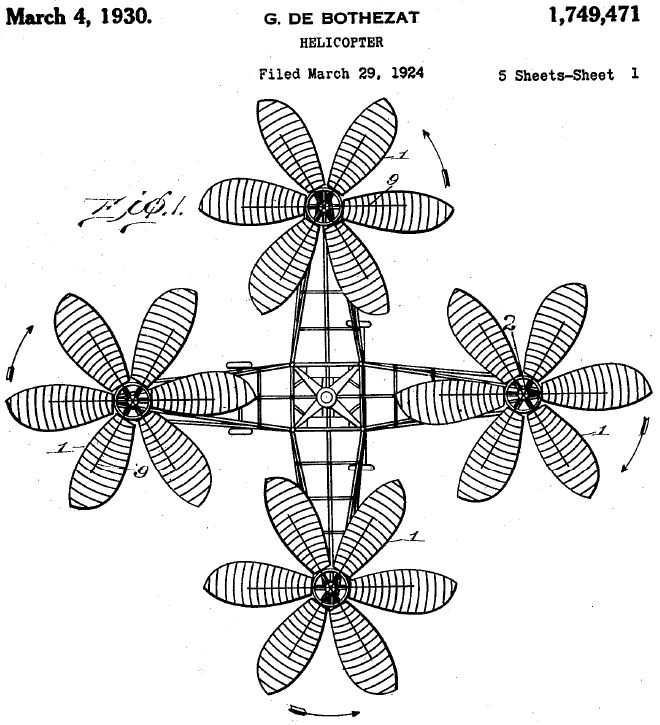
Top view of de Bothezat helicopter as depicted in US Pat. 1,749,471.

Self-described as "the world's greatest scientist and outstanding mathematician", and having written one of the first scientific papers on the aerodynamics of rotary-wing flight, (Note: de Bothezat, George. The General Theory of Blade Screws. NACA Report 29, 1920.) George de Bothezat was a refugee from the Russian Empire who had fled to the United States in the wake of the Russian Revolution. Having written and lectured extensively on rotorcraft theory, de Bothezat received a contract from the United States Army in 1921 for the construction of an experimental helicopter based on his own principles and those of his assistant Ivan Jerome.

Establishing a workshop at McCook Field in Dayton, Ohio, and working almost entirely without models or wind tunnels for testing, de Bothezat's helicopter was completed in December 1922. Featuring four six-bladed rotors at the end of massive, bridge-like girders braced with piano wire, the craft had two vertical propellers – "steering airscrews" – for lateral control, and two additional three-bladed propellers mounted horizontally above the Le Rhône engine to provide airflow for cooling. The girders were angled such that the rotors tilted in towards the craft's center at an angle of five degrees, enhancing stability. The aircraft had two control wheels, a control stick, and foot pedals for control, with each rotor featuring variable-pitch blades for individual collective control.

After initial ground testing, the de Bothezat machine made its first flight on 18 December 1922, piloted by Major T.H. Bane of the Engineering Division, and hovering to a height of 6 feet (1.8 m). The propellers for lateral control were soon found useless, and removed, while its original Le Rhône engine proved underpowered and was replaced by a Bentley rotary type. Over the next year, over one hundred flights were made, carrying up to four passengers in addition to its pilot, and setting records for duration (2 minutes 45 seconds) and altitude (30 feet (9.1 m)) for helicopter flight.

In March of 1923 Time magazine reported Thomas Edison sent Dr. Bothezaat a congratulations for a successful helicopter test flight. Edison wrote, "So far as I know, you have produced the first successful helicopter." The helicopter was tested at McCook's Field and remained airborne for 2 minutes and 45 seconds at a height of 15 feet.

== Cancellation ==
Although de Bothezat's invention was hailed by Thomas Edison as "the first successful helicopter", full control of the aircraft in flight remained elusive; in addition, the aircraft required a favorable wind to achieve forward flight. However, despite its faults, the de Bothezat helicopter did prove to be remarkably stable. De Bothezat wanted to build an improved version of the craft, but in 1924, the Army Air Service decided to terminate further work on the project, canceling the contract and ordering the helicopter to be scrapped. However, the aircraft's control column has survived, and is on display in the Smithsonian Institution's Steven F. Udvar-Hazy Center.

Although considered a failure by the Army on account of its complexity and unreliability, de Bothezat's difficult personality not helping his cause, the "Flying Octopus" had still reached a significant level of achievement, and it would be over twenty years before an American helicopter would better the machine's performance.

== Specifications ==
Data from

General characteristics

- Crew: 1 (pilot)
- Capacity: up to four "passengers", holding to the frame
- Length: 65 ft (20 m)
- Width: 65 ft (20 m)
- Height: 10 ft (3.0 m)
- Gross weight: 3,600 lb (1,633 kg)
- Powerplant: 1 × Le Rhône radial piston engine, 180 hp (130 kW) (a 220 hp Bentley rotary engine replaced Le Rhône after early testing).
- Main rotor diameter: 4 × 26 ft 7 in (8.1 m)
- Main rotor area: 900 sq ft (84 m^{2})

Performance

- Maximum speed: 30 mph (48 km/h, 26 kn) claimed
- Endurance: 2 minutes 45 seconds
- Service ceiling: 16 ft (5 m)
- Absolute ceiling: 30 ft (9.1 m)

== See also ==
Aircraft of comparable role, configuration, and era

- Bréguet-Dorand Gyroplane Laboratoire
- Bréguet-Richet Gyroplane
- Cornu helicopter
