= Luke Maximo Bell =

South African cinematographer

- Born: Luke Maximo Bell; May 11, 1994 (age 32); Johannesburg, South Africa
- Education: University of Cape Town
- Occupation: Cinematographer/ Filmmaker
- Years active: c. 2016–present
- Website: lukemaximobell.com

Luke Bell (born 1994) is a filmmaker, drone pilot and videographer from Cape Town, South Africa.

== Life and career ==
Luke studied Mechatronic Engineering at the University of Cape Town where he began his career.

In 2017 Luke was among the winners of the annual Dronestagram drone photography competition. In 2020 he was awarded first place in the music video category in the Moment Invitational Film Festival presented in New York City.

In 2020 Luke became a Sony α ambassador for Middle East and Africa.

During the COVID-19 pandemic, Luke received clearance to film the empty streets of Cape Town by drone. In more recent years he has worked as a drone pilot and drone camera operator on films like Resident Evil (TV series)† and The Year Earth Changed.

In June 2025 Luke designed, built and flew the world's fastest quadcopter/ drone.

== Filmography ==
Key
†	Denotes projects that have not yet been released

Year	Title	Director	Role	Notes
2017	Meet South Africa. Meet Bheki: The Mbhaco Maker	Teboho Mahlatsi	Social Content Videographer	
2017	Tali's Wedding Diary	Ari Kruger	Drone Pilot	8 Episodes
2020	The Age of Nature	Peter Lown	Archival Footage Contributor	1 Episode
2020	The Rolling Stones: Living in a Ghost Town	Joe Connor	Camera Operator	
2021	Tali's Baby Diary	Ari Kruger	Drone pilot	10 episodes
2021	The Year Earth Changed	Tom Beard	Aerial Footage Contributor	
2021	Facebook: Skate Nation Ghana	Bafic / Justyna Obasi / Elliott Power	Drone Pilot	
2021	Day Zero	Virginia Quinn / Kevin Sim	Aerial Footage Contributor	
2022	Resident Evil (TV series) †	Rachel Goldberg / Rob Seidenglanz / Batan Silva / Bronwen Hughes	Drone Camera Operator	

== Awards and nominations ==
Year	Association	Category	Title	Result	Notes
2015	Skypixel Photo Contest	Professional Drones in Use	Reaching for the Phantom	Nominated	3rd Place
2017	Skypixel Aerial Photo and Video Contest	Cities	The City of Cape Town	Won	
2017	Dronestagram Aerial Photo Contest	Creativity	Two Moo	Won	
2020	Moment Invitational Awards	Music Video	We Can't Breathe	Won	
2020	Siena International Photo Awards	Video	The Frozen Continent	Nominated	2nd Place
