= AltiGator =

Aerial vehicle manufacturer

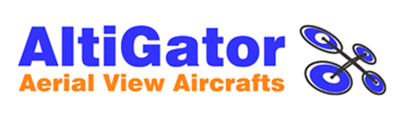
- Native name: Amphios SPRL
- Company type: Private company
- Traded as: AltiGator
- Industry: Aerospace
- Founded: 2008
- Founder: Georgios Argyrakis
- Headquarters: Waterloo, Walloon Brabant, Belgium
- Area served: Worldwide
- Products: UAV Photography Platforms, Gimbals
- Brands: OnyxStar
- Divisions: Europe
- Website: AltiGator.com

AltiGator is a multirotor unmanned aerial vehicle manufacturer founded in 2008 and headquartered in Waterloo, Walloon Brabant, Belgium. It produces complete ready-to-fly radio-controlled miniature UAVs for various professional applications. It also holds a web-shop providing spare parts, self-assembly kits and accessories for drones.

== Activity ==
AltiGator UAVs are registered under the OnyxStar trademark which is a brand for Remotely Piloted Aircraft System (RPAS) and camera mounts dedicated to this sector. They are embedding Pixhawk or MikroKopter's flight electronics, and can lift a broad range of sensors.

== Civil Aviation Authorities ==
AltiGator builds French DGAC-certified Unmanned Air Systems (UAS) used by many UAV operators in France as listed on the Directorate General for Civil Aviation website. Therefore, the company is also listed as a certified drone manufacturer on the Ministry of Ecology, Sustainable Development and Energy website because this Ministry is also in charge of Transportation and Aviation purposes.

In late April 2016, because of the brand new drone regulation in Belgium, AltiGator also became the first Belgian UAV manufacturer ever approved by the DGLV (Belgian Civil Aviation Authorities). Indeed, AltiGator drones are listed on the official list of class 1a certified drones.

== Development ==
– July 2014: AltiGator and YellowScan unveiled a complete solution for LiDAR scanning featuring the OnyxStar FOX-C8 HD together with YellowScan Mapper.

– October 2016: AltiGator and YellowScan unveiled a complete solution for Urban LiDAR surveying featuring the OnyxStar XENA together with YellowScan Surveyor.

== Former UAV Models ==
Specifications	Units	ALG-750	ALG-1000	FOX-C8
Diagonal wheelbase	mm	610	720	920
Height	mm	250	390	370
Electronics	–	MikroKopter	MikroKopter	MikroKopter
Motors	number	4	6	8
Maximum Effective Payload (sensor + gimbal)	kg	0.75	2	2.5
MTOW (Maximum Take-Off Weight)	kg	1.6	4.5	8
Endurance	min	—	—	20
Particularity	–	Reactive	Lightweight	Compact
Most common use	–	Search & Rescue	Thermal imaging	Photogrammetry

== Current UAV models ==
Specifications	Units	ALG-EOS	XENA	FOX-C8 HD	FOX-C8 XT	HYDRA-12
Diagonal wheelbase	mm	500	720	940	1200	980
Height	mm	250	400	500	550	560
Electronics	–	MikroKopter and Pixhawk	MikroKopter and Pixhawk	MikroKopter and Pixhawk	MikroKopter and Pixhawk	MikroKopter
Motors	number	4	8	8	8	12
Maximum Recommended Payload (sensor + gimbal)	kg	—	2	3	5	12
MTOW (Maximum Take-Off Weight)	kg	1.5	5.6	12	14	23
Endurance	min	45	37	37	44	30
Particularity	–	Made for training	Foldable	Multivalent	Best flight time	Best lifting capacity
Most common use	–	Learning	Industrial inspection	LIDAR	Surveillance	Spectrography
