= George de Bothezat =

Romanian/Russian-American aircraft engineer (1882–1940)

- Георгий Ботезат; Gheorghe Botezatu
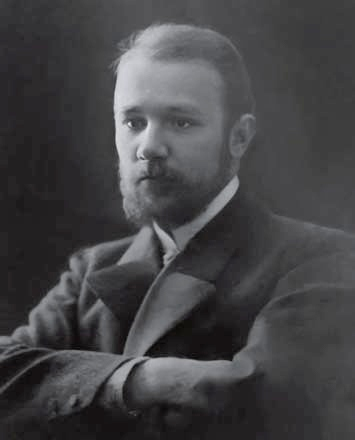
- De Bothezat in 1905
- Born: 7 June 1882; Saint Petersburg, Russian Empire
- Died: 1 February 1940 (aged 57); Boston, Massachusetts, United States
- Education: Kharkov Polytechnic Institute; University of Paris
- Spouse: Julia Ramsay Hilton
- Engineering career
- Projects: de Bothezat helicopter

George de Bothezat (Romanian: Gheorghe Botezatu, Russian: Георгий Александрович Ботезат; 7 June 1882 – 1 February 1940) was a Romanian-Russian American engineer, businessman, and pioneer of helicopter flight.

== Biography ==
George de Bothezat was born in 1882 in Saint Petersburg, Russian Empire, to Alexander Botezat and Nadine Rabutowskaja. His father Alexander Il'ich Botezat belonged to a family of Bessarabian landlords, graduated from the department of history and philology of the Saint Petersburg University and worked in the Russian Ministry of Foreign Affairs, first in Saint Petersburg and then in Paris. Mother, Nadezhda (Nadine) L'vovna Rabutovskaya, belonged to Russian nobility. After the father's death in 1900, the family returned to Russia and settled in Kishinev, where the family friend and local manufacturer Egor Ryshkan-Derozhinsky supported the educational expenses of all three children: George and his sisters Vera (born 1886) and Nina (born 1884).

After graduating the School of Exact Sciences (Realschule) in Kishinev in 1902, he started attending the Kharkov Polytechnic Institute, then Montefiore Electrotechnical Institute in Liège, Belgium (between 1905 and 1907), and graduated as engineer from Kharkov Polytechnical in 1908. He then continued his postgraduate studies at the University of Göttingen and Humboldt University of Berlin (1908–1909), and received, in 1911, his Ph.D. at the Sorbonne, for a study of aircraft stability (Étude de la Stabilité de l`aeroplane). In 1911, he joined the Faculty of Shipbuilding from the Saint Petersburg Polytechnical University, and continued theoretical studies of flight along with Stephen Timoshenko, Alexey Lebedev and Alexander Vanderfleet. His scientific interests gradually moved from general aerodynamic theory to applied studies of propellers.

In 1914, de Bothezat accepted the position of director at the Polytechnical Institute in Novocherkassk, but the outbreak of World War I compelled him to return to Saint Petersburg and join the Technical Commission of the Imperial Russian Air Force. In 1915, de Bothezat published standard bombing tables for the Air Forces, and in 1916 he was appointed chief of the Main Airfield in Saint Petersburg – Russia's first flight research facility. He managed the design team of the DEKA aircraft plant in Saint Petersburg, and was credited with the design of a single-engined aircraft that was tested in 1917.

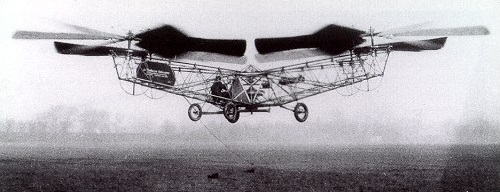
The de Bothezat helicopter.

In May 1918, with his homeland in the throes of the Russian Revolution, de Bothezat fled from the Bolsheviks to the United States. In June 1918, he was hired by the National Advisory Committee for Aeronautics. He lectured at the Massachusetts Institute of Technology and the Columbia University.

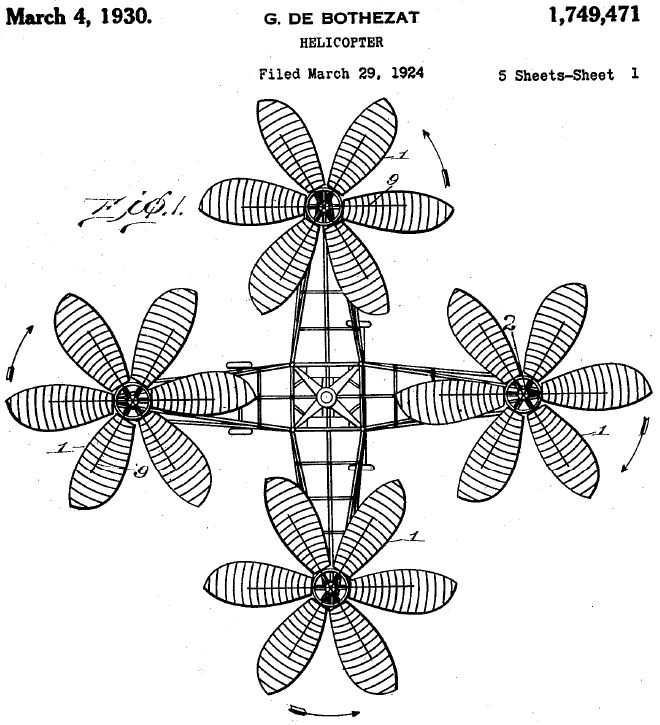
Top view of de Bothezat helicopter as depicted in US Pat. 1,749,471.

In 1921, the US Army Air Service hired de Bothezat to build a prototype helicopter. The quadrotor helicopter, known simply as the de Bothezat helicopter, was built by de Bothezat and Ivan Jerome in the hangars of Wright Field near Dayton, Ohio. The first flight turned out to be surprisingly successful for a machine that had been built without prototyping. In 1922, their "flying octopus" flew many times, although slowly and at low altitudes. In fact, its horizontal motion was induced by wind more than by the pilot's controls. He was granted US Patent number 1,749,471 for his design.

In March 1923 Time magazine reported Thomas Edison sent Dr. Bothezaat a congratulations for a successful helicopter test flight. Edison wrote, "So far as I know, you have produced the first successful helicopter." The helicopter was tested at McCook's Field and remained airborne for 2 minutes and 45 seconds at a height of 15 feet.

The US Army, now more interested in autogyros, cancelled the underperforming project.

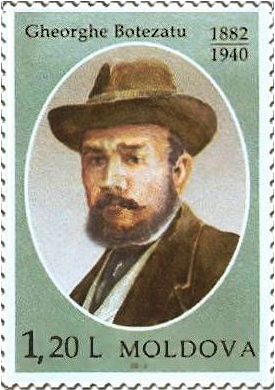
George de Bothezat stamp issued by Moldova Post

De Bothezat returned to New York City and started his own business in making industrial fans, which was incorporated in 1926 as de Bothezat Impeller Company, Inc. The company's axial fans were installed on US Navy cruisers, but this was as far as de Bothezat would go in dealing with the government. He continued publishing essays on topics ranging from flight dynamics to economics of the Great Depression. His 1936 book Back to Newton attacked Albert Einstein's theory of relativity and the whole world of contemporary academics "who are utterly unable to acquaint themselves with the subject". Einstein personally refuted de Bothezat's claim at a public lecture given by de Bothezat at Princeton on 15 June 1935. He worked for the film industry, designing mechanical special effects props for Dudley Murphy's The Love of Sunya (1927).

In 1938 de Bothezat returned to designing and building helicopters. His new company was incorporated as Air-Screw Research Syndicate and later renamed Helicopter Corporation of America. Boris Sergievsky, former test pilot of Sikorsky Aircraft, became de Bothezat's partner and test pilot. De Bothezat's new helicopter was a coaxial design, with the engine mounted between two rotors. The first machine, SV-2, was built and tested on Roosevelt Field in 1938; after the tests de Bothezat and Sergievsky rebuilt it into a heavier SV-5. However de Bothezat, who was also designing a one-man "personal helicopter" for infantrymen, died before the SV-5 could be properly tested. The new machine proved to be unstable and crashed; Sergievsky escaped unharmed.

== See also ==
- de Bothezat helicopter
- Cornu helicopter
- Multirotor
- Quadcopter

== Selected works ==
- The general theory of blade screws (1920). National Advisory Committee for Aeronautics.
- General theory of the steady motion of an airplane (1921). National Advisory Committee for Aeronautics.
- The Depression, Its Real Causes and the Remedy (1933). Economic Security League.
