= Étienne Oehmichen =

French helicopter designer (1884–1955)

Étienne Œhmichen
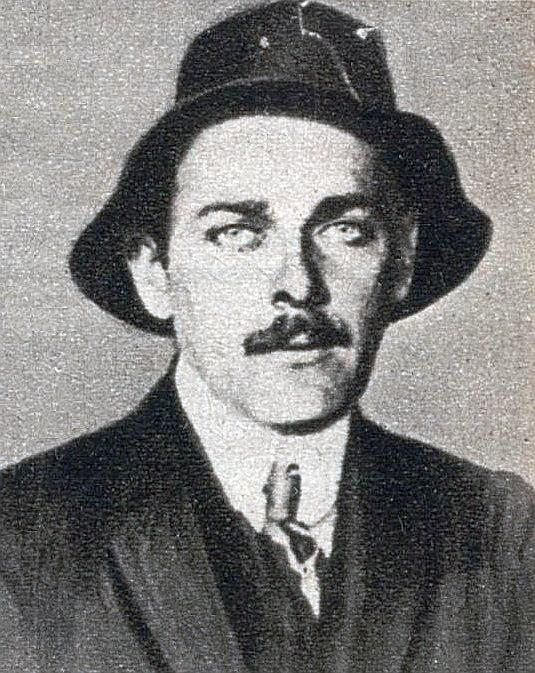
- Œhmichen in 1924
- Born: Étienne Edmond Œhmichen; 15 October 1884; Châlons-en-Champagne
- Died: 10 July 1955 (aged 70); Paris
- Education: École Centrale Paris
- Occupation: engineer
- Known for: helicopter designer

Étienne Edmond Œhmichen (French: [ømiʃɛn]; 15 October 1884 – 10 July 1955) was a French engineer and helicopter designer.

== Biography ==
Œhmichen was born in Châlons-sur-Marne Châlons-en-Champagne. He studied at École Centrale Paris. He patented the first electric stroboscope in 1917, building at the same time a camera capable of shooting 1,000 frames per second.

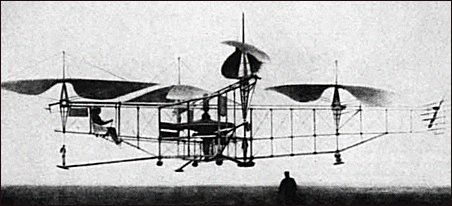
Oehmichen N°2 1922

His first successful flight with a helicopter took place on 18 February 1921. On 11 November 1922, he first flew 'Oehmichen No.2', an improved helicopter featuring small vertically mounted rotors which rotated in the opposite direction from the large lifting rotors, probably creating the first reliable flying helicopter capable of carrying a person. This work later led to the development of the tail rotor. On 14 April 1924, he broke the existing record for helicopter flight with a flight of 360 m and 525 m a few days later, just before being surpassed by Raúl Pateras Pescara. On 4 May 1924, he won a prize of 90,000 French Francs for the first successful closed circuit helicopter flight following a triangular trajectory with a length of approximately one km, a flight which took approximately 7 minutes and 40 seconds. The same year, he made a flight with two passengers.

In 1931, Œhmichen invented and tested a type of blimp he called the "Hélicostat", controlled by four movable propellers, which could hover, take off, and land without ground crew.

Œhmichen was also a biologist and studied insect wing function, especially in dragonflies. He worked at the Collège de France in Paris for 30 years until his retirement.

== Publications ==
His writing and photographs contained observations of the bird and insect flight.

- In 1920, Nos maîtres les oiseaux, étude sur le vol animal et la récupération de l'énergie dans les fluides, Dunod. (Our masters, the birds, a study on animal flight and recovering energy in fluids)
- In 1938, Il publie chez Hermann et Cie, Éditeur des Actualités Scientifiques et Industrielles (584), Mécanismes naturels et technique humaine, Exposés publiés sous sa direction "La sécurité aérienne animaux et machines" La fin du livre est illustrée de l'appareil n°1.
- Archive is available at Collège de France.
