= MikroKopter =

German UAV manufacturer

- Company type: Privately held company
- Industry: Aerospace
- Headquarters: Moormerland, Leer, Lower Saxony, Germany
- Products: Miniature UAVs
- Website: www.mikrokopter.de/en/home

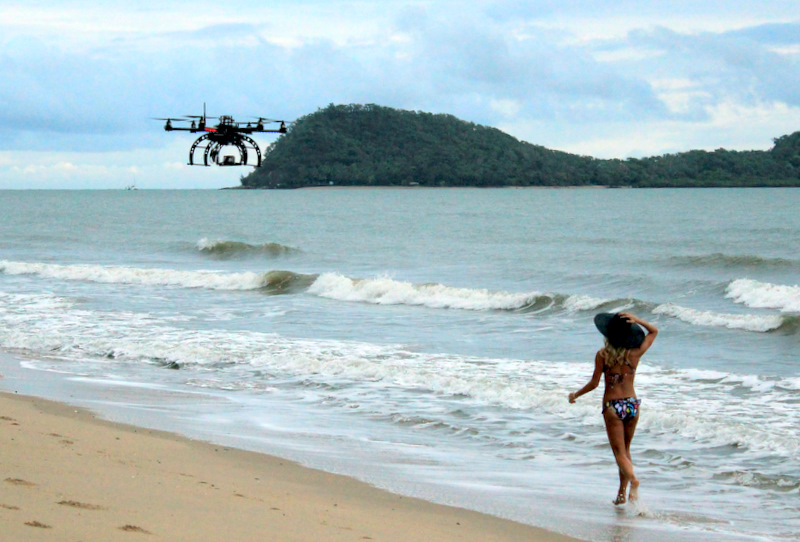
MikroKopter in flight

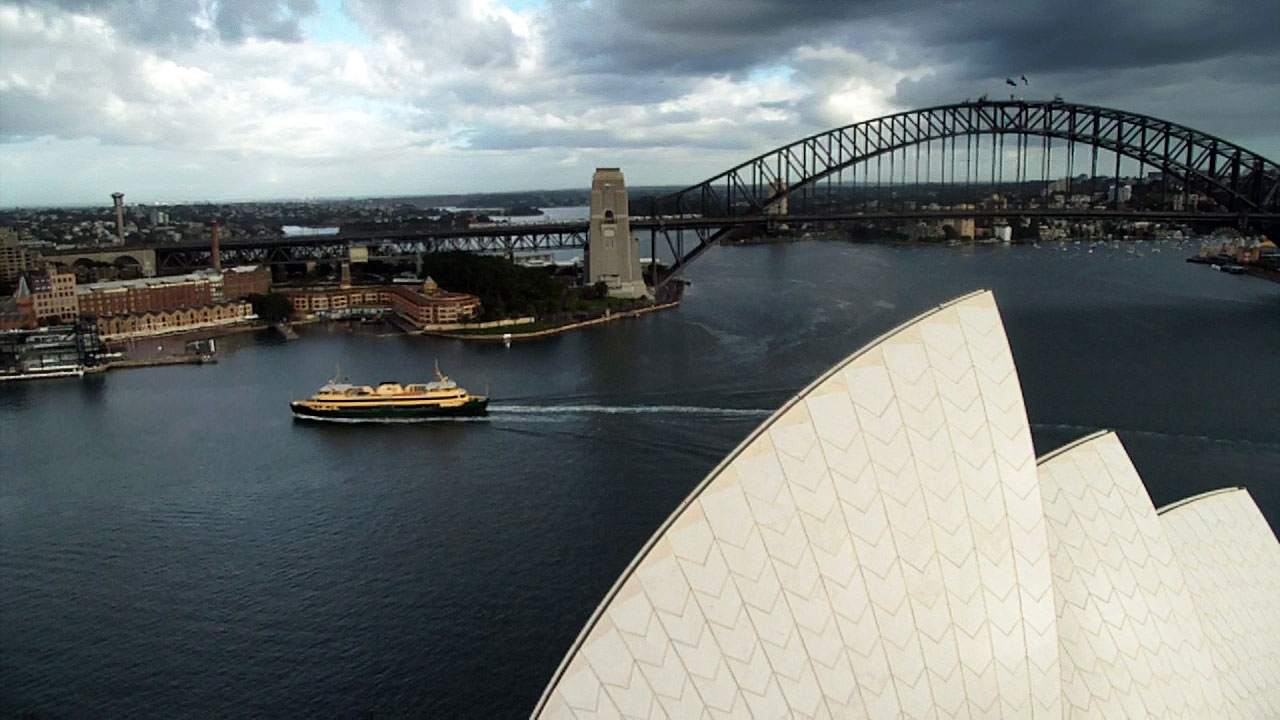
View of Sydney Harbour taken by MikroKopter

MikroKopter is a German company, a subsidiary of HiSystems GmbH, that manufactures battery-powered radio-controlled unmanned aerial vehicles. The company is located in Moormerland, Leer District, in Lower Saxony.

== History ==
Started in 2006, by Holger Buss and Ingo Busker, MikroKopter used a team of pilots to develop within 6 months a platform with great stability, manoeuvrability and powerful enough to lift a payload of several kilograms. Further developments, which incorporated an onboard GPS, piezo gyroscope, an acceleration sensor and a barometric sensor for altitude control, made autonomous flight possible and improved manoeuvrability.

== Products ==
MikroKopter produce various multi-rotor models such as QuadroKopter (a quadcopter), HexaKopter and OktoKopter. The design lends itself to computer control and robotics researchers at the University of Pennsylvania have developed a program to control swarms of what they term 'Nano Quadrotors'. CCTV cameras provide feedback on position to the controlling computer, permitting complex manoeuvres that include tumbling.

Parent HiSystems GmbH has developed a built-in LEA-6S GPS receiver, u-blox’ highest-performance GPS module for MikroKopter aircraft that allows precision positioning for photography and other applications.

== Operational use ==
In February 2012 an animal rights group used a MikroKopter to film hunters shooting pigeons in South Carolina. The hunters shot the drone down.
