= List of Java frameworks =

Below is a list of notable Java programming language technologies (frameworks, libraries).

Name	Details
Apache Nutch	Nutch is a well matured, production ready Web crawler.
AppFuse	open-source Java EE web application framework.
Drools	Business rule management system (BRMS) with a forward and backward chaining inference based rules engine, using an enhanced implementation of the Rete algorithm.
jBPM	Flexible Business Process Management (BPM) Suite
Activiti	Workflow engine written in Java that can execute business processes described in BPMN 2.0.
Akka	Toolkit and runtime simplifying the construction of concurrent and distributed applications on the JVM.
Apache Accumulo	Distributed key/value store that provides robust, scalable data storage and retrieval.
Apache ActiveMQ	Messaging and Integration Patterns server.
Apache Avro	Remote procedure call and data serialization framework developed within Apache's Hadoop project.
Apache Axis	Implementation of the SOAP (Simple Object Access Protocol) submission to W3C
Apache Camel	Rule-based routing and mediation engine that provides a Java object-based implementation of the Enterprise Integration Patterns using an API to configure routing and mediation rules.
Apache Click	Component oriented web application framework for the Java language and is built on top of the Java Servlet API
Apache Cocoon	Web application framework built around the concepts of pipeline, separation of concerns and component-based web development.
Apache Commons	Collection of open source reusable Java components from the Apache/Jakarta community
Apache CXF	Services framework. CXF helps to build and develop services using frontend programming APIs, like JAX-WS and JAX-RS.
Apache Empire DB	Relational database abstraction layer and data persistence component that allows developers to take a much more SQL-centric approach in application development than traditional Object-relational mapping frameworks.
Apache Felix	Apache Felix is a community effort to implement the OSGi Framework and Service platform and other interesting OSGi-related technologies under the Apache license.
Apache Flume	Distributed, reliable, and available service for efficiently collecting, aggregating, and moving large amounts of log data.
Apache Geronimo	Open source server runtime that integrates the best open source projects to create Java/OSGi server runtimes that meet the needs of enterprise developers and system administrators
Apache Giraph	Iterative graph processing system built for high scalability.
Apache Hadoop	Framework that allows for the distributed processing of large data sets across clusters of computers using simple programming models.
Apache HBase	Non-relational, distributed database modeled after Google's BigTable
Apache Hive	Component of Hortonworks Data Platform(HDP). Hive provides a SQL-like interface to data stored in HDP.
Apache JackRabbit	Content repository for the Java platform.
Apache Jena	Web framework for building Semantic web apps in Java. It provides an API to extract data from and write to RDF graphs
Apache Kafka	Stream processing platform
Apache Log4j	Java logging framework - Log4j 2 is the enhanced version of the popular Log4j project.
Apache Lucene	High-performance, full-featured text search engine library.
Apache Mahout	Project of the Apache Software Foundation to produce free implementations of distributed or otherwise scalable machine learning algorithms focused primarily in the areas of collaborative filtering, clustering and classification.
Apache Mesos	Apache Mesos abstracts CPU, memory, storage, and other compute resources away from machines (physical or virtual), enabling fault-tolerant and elastic distributed systems to easily be built and run effectively.
Apache Mina	Java network application framework. MINA can be used to create scalable, high performance network applications.
Apache OODT	Data management system framework
Apache Oozie	Server-based workflow scheduling system to manage Hadoop jobs.
Apache OpenNLP	Java machine learning toolkit for natural language processing (NLP).
Apache PDFBox	Java tool for working with PDF documents.
Apache Pig	High-level platform for creating programs that run on Apache Hadoop.
Apache Pivot	Platform for building rich web applications in Java or any JVM-compatible language.
Apache POI	APIs for manipulating various file formats based upon Microsoft's OLE 2 Compound Document format.
Apache Qpid	Messaging system, implements the Advanced Message Queuing Protocol.
Apache River (Jini)	Apache River is a project furthering the development and advancement of Jini technology. River is the implementation of Jini service oriented architecture.
Apache Samza	Distributed stream processing framework.
Apache Shiro	Java security framework that performs authentication, authorization, cryptography, and session management.
Apache Sling	Web framework for the Java platform designed to create content-centric applications on top of a JSR-170-compliant (a.k.a. JCR) content repository such as Apache Jackrabbit.
Apache Solr	Enterprise search platform
Apache Spark	Fast and general engine for big data processing, with built-in modules for streaming, SQL, machine learning and graph processing.
Apache Storm	Distributed realtime computation system.
Apache Struts	Framework for building Servlet/JSP based web applications based on the MVC design paradigm
Apache Tapestry	Component-oriented Java web application framework
Apache Tika	Content detection and analysis framework.
Apache Tomcat	Tomcat Server, is an open-source Java Servlet Container
Apache Uima	Unstructured Information Management Architecture, is an OASIS standard for content analytics. It provides a component software architecture for the development, discovery, composition, and deployment of multi-modal analytics for the analysis of unstructured information and integration with search technologies.
Apache Velocity	Java-based template engine that provides a template language to reference objects defined in Java code
Apache Wicket	Component-oriented Java web application framework.
Apache Xerces	Collection of software libraries for parsing, validating, serializing and manipulating XML.
Apache Zookeeper	Centralized service for maintaining configuration information, naming, providing distributed synchronization, and providing group services.
Barracuda	MVC web application framework for developing Java EE web applications.
Birt	Reporting and business intelligence tool for rich client and web applications
BioJava	Java framework for processing biological data.
BlueCove	Java library for Bluetooth (JSR-82 implementation)
Bouncy Castle Cryptographic	Collection of APIs used in cryptography. It includes APIs for both the Java and the C# programming languages.
Burningwave Core	Java library to build frameworks.
Cascading	Abstraction layer for Apache Hadoop and Apache Flink. Cascading is used to create and execute complex data processing workflows on a Hadoop cluster using any JVM-based language.
CodeName One	Set of software development tools aiming to provide ›Write Once, Run Anywhere‹ code for various desktop and mobile operating systems (like Windows, macOS, Android, Blackberry, iOS and others).
CruiseControl	Continuous build process
Deeplearning4j	Open-Source Deep-Learning Software for Java and Scala on Hadoop and Spark.
Direct Web Remoting	library that enables Java on the server and JavaScript in a browser to interact and call each other as simply as possible.
EclipseLink	Java persistence solution addressing relational, XML, and database web services.
EHCache	Ehcache is an open source, standards-based cache that boosts performance, offloads your database, and simplifies scalability.
Ejml (Efficient Java Matrix Library)	Java linear algebra library for manipulating dense matrices.
Elasticsearch	Multitenant-capable full-text search engine with an HTTP web interface and schema-free JSON documents.
ELKI	Data mining
FreeMarker Template	Java-based Template Engine, originally focusing on dynamic web page generation with MVC software architecture
GeoApi	Set of Java language programming interfaces for geospatial applications.
GeoTools	Java library that provides tools for geospatial data.
GlassFish	Application server and official reference implementation for Servlets 3.0.
Google Gson	Library to serialize and deserialize Java objects to (and from) JSON.
Google Guava	Set of common libraries, it facilitates best coding practices and helps reduce coding errors. It provides utility methods for collections, caching, primitives support, concurrency, common annotations, string processing, I/O, and validations.
Google Guice	Lightweight dependency injection framework for Java 6 and above
Google Web Toolkit (GWT)	Set of tools that allows web developers to create and maintain complex JavaScript front-end applications in Java.
Grails	Apache Groovy based web framework built on Spring Boot.
Hibernate	Object-relational mapping tool for the Java programming language. It provides a framework for mapping an object-oriented domain model to a relational database.
HSQLDB	RDBMS with JDBC interface, client-server version, query tool, grid, tree, performance test class, servlet, and self-test program.
iBatis	Persistence framework which automates the mapping between SQL databases and objects in Java, .NET, and Ruby on Rails.
Infinispan	Distributed in-memory key/value data store with optional schema
IText	Dynamic PDF generation and manipulation for web- and other applications (Java, C#).
Jackson	High-performance JSON processor for Java.
Java Astrodynamics Toolkit	Libraries of components to assist software makers create their own applications to solve problems in Astrodynamics, mission design, spacecraft navigation, guidance and control
Java Collections Framework	The Java Collections Framework (JCF) is a set of classes and interfaces that implement commonly reusable collection data structures.
JavaFX	Modern UI framework for Java desktop and rich internet applications.
Java Media Framework	The Java Media Framework (JMF) is a Java library that enables audio, video and other time-based media to be added to Java applications and applets.
Java Topology suite	Java Topology Suite (JTS) is an open-source Java software library that provides an object model for Euclidean planar linear geometry together with a set of fundamental geometric functions.
JAXB	Java Architecture for XML Binding, converts Java objects to XML and vice versa.
JaxP	Java XML Application programming interfaces (API)s, provides the capability of validating and parsing XML documents.
JAX-RS	Java API for RESTful Web Services
JAX-WS	Java API for XML Web Services, for creating SOAP-based web services.
JBoss Seam	Web application framework developed by JBoss
JDom	Java-based document object model for XML
Jersey	Jersey RESTful Web Services framework, implementation of JAX-RS
Jetty	Java HTTP (Web) server and Java Servlet container.
JFreeChart	Java chart library
JHipster	JHipster is a development platform to generate, develop and deploy Spring Boot + Angular Web applications and Spring microservices.
JMonkeyEngine	Game engine made especially for modern 3D development, as it uses shader technology extensively.
JProfiler	Java profiling tool for performance Tuning
JRockit	Java profiling tool for performance Tuning
JSF	Java specification for building component-based user interfaces for web applications.
JSoup	Java HTML parser library. Supports extracting and manipulating data using DOM, CSS, and JQuery methods.
JUNG	Framework for modeling, analyzing, and visualizing graphs and networks
JUnit	Unit testing framework
Keycloak	Single sign-on and identity and access management framework.
LiquiBase	Liquibase is an open source database-independent library for tracking, managing and applying database schema changes.
LWJGL	Java library that enables cross-platform access to popular native APIs such as OpenGL, OpenAL, and OpenCL.
Micronaut	A modern, JVM-based, full-stack framework for building modular, easily testable microservice and serverless applications
Mockito	Unit testing framework for Java, framework allows the creation of test double objects (mock objects) in automated unit tests for the purpose of Test-driven Development (TDD) or Behavior Driven Development (BDD).
MyBatis	First class persistence framework with support for custom SQL, stored procedures and advanced mappings.
NanoSat MO Framework	Framework for small satellites based on CCSDS Mission Operations services
Netty	Netty is a non-blocking I/O (NIO) client-server framework for the development of Java network applications such as protocol servers and clients.
Neuroph	Java neural network framework which supports common neural network architectures and learning rules.
OpenCV	Library of programming functions mainly aimed at real-time computer vision.
Oracle Application Development Framework	For building enterprise applications
Oracle WebLogic	Java EE application server
OrientDB	NoSQL database management system written in Java. It is a multi-model database, supporting graph, document, key/value, and object models but the relationships are managed as in graph databases with direct connections between records.
ORMLite	Object Relational Mapping Lite (ORM Lite) provides some functionality for persisting Java objects to SQL databases while avoiding the complexity and overhead of more standard ORM packages.
Play	Play Framework is used to build web applications with Java & Scala.
PrimeFaces	User interface (UI) component library for JavaServer Faces (JSF) based applications.
Quarkus	SUPERSONIC / SUBATOMIC / JAVA
Quartz	Job scheduling library that can be integrated into a wide variety of Java applications.
Sax	Event-driven online algorithm for parsing XML documents, with an API developed by the XML-DEV mailing list.
Selenium	Library that provides automated control for web-browser, widely used in web applications testing
SLF4J	Simple Logging Facade for Java (SLF4J) serves as a simple facade or abstraction for various logging frameworks.
SonarQube	Platform for continuous inspection of code quality.
Jasper Reports	Java reporting tool that can write to a variety of targets, such as: screen, a printer, into PDF, HTML, Microsoft Excel, RTF, ODT, Comma-separated values or XML files.
Spock	Testing and specification framework for Java and Groovy applications.
Spring Integration	Framework for enterprise application integration.
Spring Roo	Spring Roo is an open source software tool that uses convention-over-configuration principles to provide rapid application development of Java-based enterprise software
Spring Security	Authentication and access-control framework
TestNG	JUnit-inspired test framework with extra functionality.
Thymeleaf	Java XML/XHTML/HTML5 template engine that can work both in web (Servlet-based) and non-web environments
Vaadin	Web framework for rich Internet applications. In contrast to JavaScript libraries and browser-plugin based solutions
Vertx	Polyglot event-driven application framework that runs on the Java Virtual Machine.
Wildfly	Application server framework that implements the Jakarta EE (formerly Java EE) specification.
ZKoss	Ajax Web application framework, written in Java
Flying Saucer	Java library for rendering XML, XHTML, and CSS 2.1 content
