= List of numerical libraries =

This is a list of numerical libraries, which are libraries used in software development for performing numerical calculations. It is not a complete listing but is instead a list of numerical libraries with articles on Wikipedia, with few exceptions.

The choice of a typical library depends on a range of requirements such as: desired features (e.g. large dimensional linear algebra, parallel computation, partial differential equations), licensing, readability of API, portability or platform/compiler dependence (e.g. Linux, Windows, Visual C++, GCC), performance, ease-of-use, continued support from developers, standard compliance/precision/reproducibility, specialized optimization in code for specific application scenario, or even the size of the code-base to be installed.

This list is sorted by from what languages a library is designed to be usable, not by what the libraries are written in (an implementation detail).

Some numerical tasks are performed by standard library functions. These are not listed here, though some "see also" links to relevant pages may be included.

== Multi-language ==
- ALGLIB is an open source numerical analysis library which may be used from C++, C#, FreePascal, Delphi, VBA.
- ArrayFire is a high performance open source software library for parallel computing with an easy-to-use API.
- IMSL Numerical Libraries are libraries of numerical analysis functionality implemented in standard programming languages like C, Java, C# .NET, Fortran, and Python.
- The NAG Library is a collection of mathematical and statistical routines for multiple programming languages (C, C++, Fortran, Visual Basic, Java, Python and C#) and packages (MATLAB, Excel, R, LabVIEW). Some of these require a commercial license.
- librsb is an open source library for high performance sparse matrix computations providing multi-threaded primitives to build iterative solvers (implements also the Sparse BLAS standard). It can be used from C, C++, Fortran, and a dedicated GNU Octave package.

On most computer systems, the C application binary interface (ABI) functions as a "lingua franca" ABI callable from a variety of languages via a foreign function interface. This makes the "C" section also multi-language. To resolve this ambiguity, this section specifically lists libraries with more than one designed interfaces, e.g. a C API/ABI and a Fortran API/ABI.

=== BLAS, LAPACK, etc. ===
- BLAS (Basic Linear Algebra Subprograms) is a application programming interface standard for libraries that perform basic linear algebra operations such as vector and matrix multiplication.
- LAPACK (Linear Algebra Package) is a software library for numerical computing originally written in FORTRAN 77 and now written in Fortran 90.

Both of these used to be Fortran-only software libraries that later gained C interfaces. Both of these libraries were originally hosted on the Netlib repository with very permissive licenses, resulting in them being widely forked and turning into de facto API standards. BLAS has since officially evolved into an interface specification.

- Netlib, a repository of scientific computing software which contains a large number of separate programs and libraries including the original versions of BLAS, EISPACK, LAPACK and others.
- Intel MKL (Math Kernel Library) contains optimized math routines for science, engineering, and financial applications, and is written in C/C++ and Fortran. Core math functions include BLAS, LAPACK, ScaLAPACK, sparse solvers, fast Fourier transforms, and vector math.
- OpenBLAS is an open source implementation of the BLAS API with many hand-crafted optimizations for specific processor types. It performs similar to Intel MKL on Intel processors and higher on various others.
- BLIS is an open-source framework for implementing a superset of BLAS functionality for specific processor types that was awarded the J. H. Wilkinson Prize for Numerical Software.

Related libraries that have remained Fortran-only include:

- EISPACK is a software library for numerical computation of eigenvalues and eigenvectors of matrices, written in FORTRAN. It contains subroutines for calculating the eigenvalues of nine classes of matrices: complex general, complex Hermitian, real general, real symmetric, real symmetric banded, real symmetric tridiagonal, special real tridiagonal, generalized real, and generalized real symmetric matices.
- LINPACK is a software library for performing numerical linear algebra on digital computers. It was written in Fortran by Jack Dongarra, Jim Bunch, Cleve Moler, and Pete Stewart, and was intended for use on supercomputers in the 1970s and early 1980s. It has been largely superseded by LAPACK, which will run more efficiently on modern architectures.

These two have superseded, but as their inclusion in Intel MKL show, they were also widely-forked de facto standards in their hayday.

=== Numerically-oriented programming languages ===
A few programming languages are designed for numerical work. These include GNU Octave, Maple, MATLAB, Mathematica, Julia, etc. Programs written in these languages may be invoked from a variety of programing languages.

== C ==
- BLOPEX (Block Locally Optimal Preconditioned Eigenvalue Xolvers) is an open-source library for the scalable (parallel) solution of eigenvalue problems.
- Fastest Fourier Transform in the West (FFTW) is a software library for computing Fourier and related transforms.
- GNU Scientific Library, a popular, free numerical analysis library implemented in C.
- GNU Multi-Precision Library is a library for doing arbitrary-precision arithmetic.
- hypre (High Performance Preconditioners) is an open-source library of routines for scalable (parallel) solution of linear systems and preconditioning.
- LabWindows/CVI is an ANSI C IDE that includes built-in libraries for analysis of raw measurement data, signal generation, windowing, filter functions, signal processing, linear algebra, array and complex operations, curve fitting and statistics.
- Lis is a scalable parallel library for solving systems of linear equations and eigenvalue problems using iterative methods.
- Intel IPP is a multi-threaded software library of functions for multimedia and data processing applications.
- Portable, Extensible Toolkit for Scientific Computation (PETSc), is a suite of data structures and routines for the scalable (parallel) solution of scientific applications modeled by partial differential equations.
- SLEPc Scalable Library for Eigenvalue Problem Computations is a PETSc-based open-source library for the scalable (parallel) solution of eigenvalue problems.
- UMFPACK is a library for solving sparse linear systems, written in Ansi C. It is the backend for sparse matrices in MATLAB and SciPy.

== C++ ==
- Adept is a combined automatic differentiation and array library.
- Advanced Simulation Library is free and open source hardware accelerated multiphysics simulation software with an OpenCL-based internal computational engine.
- Armadillo is a C++ linear algebra library (matrix and vector maths), aiming towards a good balance between speed and ease of use. It employs template classes, and has optional links to BLAS and LAPACK. The syntax (API) is similar to MATLAB.
- Blitz++ is a high-performance vector mathematics library written in C++.
- Boost.uBLAS, a C++ template library implementing the BLAS API (only callable from C++)
- deal.II is a library supporting finite element methods for partial differential equations.
- Dlib is a modern C++ library with easy-to-use linear algebra and optimization tools which benefit from optimized BLAS and LAPACK libraries.
- Eigen is a vector mathematics library with performance comparable with Intel's Math Kernel Library
- Hermes Project: C++/Python library for rapid prototyping of space- and space-time adaptive hp-FEM solvers.
- IML++ is a C++ library for solving linear systems of equations, capable of dealing with dense, sparse, and distributed matrices.
- IT++ is a C++ library for linear algebra (matrices and vectors), signal processing and communications. Functionality similar to MATLAB and Octave.
- LAPACK++, a C++ wrapper library for LAPACK and BLAS
- MFEM is a free, lightweight, scalable C++ library for finite element methods.
- mlpack is an open-source library for machine learning, exploiting C++ language features to provide maximum performance and flexibility while providing a simple and consistent API
- MTL4 is a generic C++ template library providing sparse and dense BLAS functionality. MTL4 establishes an intuitive interface (similar to MATLAB) and broad applicability thanks to Generic programming.
- NTL is a C++ library for number theory.
- OpenFOAM is an open-source C++ library for solving partial differential equations in computational fluid dynamics (CFD).
- SU2 code is an open-source library for solving partial differential equations with the finite volume or finite element method.
- Trilinos is an effort to develop algorithms and enabling technologies for the solution of large-scale, complex multi-physics engineering and scientific problems. It is a collection of packages.
- Template Numerical Toolkit (TNT) linear algebra software in the public domain and entirely in the form of headers, from NIST. TNT was originally presented as a successor to Lapack++, Sparselib++, and IML++.

== .NET Framework languages: C#, F#, VB.NET and PowerShell ==
- Accord.NET is a collection of libraries for scientific computing, including numerical linear algebra, optimization, statistics, artificial neural networks, machine learning, signal processing and computer vision. LGPLv3, partly GPLv3.
- AForge.NET is a computer vision and artificial intelligence library. It implements a number of genetic, fuzzy logic and machine learning algorithms with several architectures of artificial neural networks with corresponding training algorithms. LGPLv3 and partly GPLv3.
- ILNumerics.Net Commercial high performance, typesafe numerical array classes and functions for general math, FFT and linear algebra, aims .NET/mono, 32&64 bit, script-like syntax in C#, 2D & 3D plot controls, efficient memory management.
- IMSL Numerical Libraries have C# version (commercially licensed). IMSL .Net have announced end of life at the end of 2020.
- Math.NET Numerics aims to provide methods and algorithms for numerical computations in science, engineering and everyday use. Covered topics include special functions, linear algebra, probability models, random numbers, interpolation, integral transforms and more. Free software under MIT/X11 license.
- Measurement Studio is a commercial integrated suite UI controls and class libraries for use in developing test and measurement applications. The analysis class libraries provide various digital signal processing, signal filtering, signal generation, peak detection, and other general mathematical functionality.
- ML.NET is a free software machine learning library for the C# programming language.
- NMath by CenterSpace Software: Commercial numerical component libraries for the .NET platform, including signal processing (FFT) classes, a linear algebra (LAPACK & BLAS) framework, and a statistics package.

== Fortran ==
- CERNLIB is a collection of FORTRAN 77 libraries and modules.
- IMSL Numerical Libraries are cross-platform libraries containing a comprehensive set of mathematical and statistical functions that can be embedded in a users application.
- Harwell Subroutine Library is a collection of Fortran 77 and 95 codes that address core problems in numerical analysis.
- Lis is a scalable parallel library for solving systems of linear equations and eigenvalue problems using iterative methods.
- MINPACK is a library of FORTRAN subroutines for the solving of systems of nonlinear equations, or the least squares minimization of the residual of a set of linear or nonlinear equations.
- NOVAS is a software library for astrometry-related numerical computations. Both Fortran and C versions are available.
- PAW is a free data analysis package developed at CERN.
- Portable, Extensible Toolkit for Scientific Computation (PETSc), is a suite of data structures and routines for the scalable (parallel) solution of scientific applications modeled by partial differential equations.
- QUADPACK is a FORTRAN 77 library for numerical integration of one-dimensional functions
- SLATEC is a FORTRAN 77 library of over 1400 general purpose mathematical and statistical routines.
- SOFA is a collection of subroutines that implement official IAU algorithms for astronomical computations. Both Fortran and C versions are available.
- ARPACK is a collection of Fortran77 subroutines designed to solve large scale eigenvalue problems.

== Java ==
- Apache Commons, is an open-source for creating reusable Java components. It has numerical packages for linear algebra and non-linear optimization.
- Colt provides a set of Open Source Libraries for High Performance Scientific and Technical Computing.
- Efficient Java Matrix Library (EJML) is an open-source linear algebra library for manipulating dense matrices.
- JAMA, a numerical linear algebra toolkit for the Java programming language. No active development has taken place since 2005, but it still one of the more popular linear algebra packages in Java.
- Jblas: Linear Algebra for Java, a linear algebra library which is an easy-to-use wrapper around BLAS and LAPACK.
- Parallel Colt is an open source library for scientific computing. A parallel extension of Colt.
- Matrix Toolkit Java is a linear algebra library based on BLAS and LAPACK.
- ojAlgo is an open source Java library for mathematics, linear algebra and optimisation.
- exp4j is a small Java library for evaluation of mathematical expressions.
- SuanShu is an open-source Java math library. It supports numerical analysis, statistics and optimization.
- Maja is an open-source Java library focusing primarily on correct implementations of various special functions.

== OCaml ==
OCaml programming language has support for array programming in the standard library, also with a specific module named bigarrays for multi-dimensional, numerical arrays, with both C and Fortran layout options. A comprehensive support of numerical computations is provided by the library Owl Scientific Computing which provides methods for statistics, linear algebra (using OpenBLAS), differential equations, algorithmic differentiation, Fourier fast transform, or deep neural networks. Other numerical libraries in OCaml are Lacaml that interfaces BLAS and LAPACK Fortran/C libraries, L-BFGS-ocaml (OCaml bindings for L-BFGS). For visualization there are libraries for plotting using PLplot, gnuplot or matplotlib.

== Perl ==
- Perl Data Language gives standard Perl the ability to compactly store and speedily manipulate the large N-dimensional data arrays. It can perform complex and matrix maths, and has interfaces for the GNU Scientific Library, LINPACK, PROJ, and plotting with PGPLOT. There are libraries on CPAN adding support for the linear algebra library LAPACK, the Fourier transform library FFTW, and plotting with gnuplot, and PLplot.

== Python ==
- JAX, an Apache-licensed library for numerical computing, automatic differentiation, and accelerator-oriented array computation in Python.
- NumPy, a BSD-licensed library that adds support for the manipulation of large, multi-dimensional arrays and matrices; it also includes a large collection of high-level mathematical functions. NumPy serves as the backbone for a number of other numerical libraries, notably SciPy. De facto standard for matrix/tensor operations in Python.
- Pandas, a library for data manipulation and analysis.
- SageMath is a large mathematical software application which integrates the work of nearly 100 free software projects and supports linear algebra, combinatorics, numerical mathematics, calculus, and more.
- SciPy, a large BSD-licensed library of scientific tools. De facto standard for scientific computations in Python.
- ScientificPython, a library with a different set of scientific tools
- SymPy, a library based on New BSD license for symbolic computation. Features of Sympy range from basic symbolic arithmetic to calculus, algebra, discrete mathematics and quantum physics.

== Others ==
- XNUMBERS – multi-precision floating-Point computing and numerical methods for Microsoft Excel.
- INTLAB – interval arithmetic library for MATLAB.

== See also ==
- List of computer algebra systems
- List of information graphics software
- List of numerical analysis programming languages
- List of numerical-analysis software
- List of open-source mathematical libraries
- List of open-source code libraries
- List of optimization software
- List of statistical software
