= List of Kotlin software and tools =

Kotlin software and development tools

This is a list of software and programming tools for the Kotlin programming language, which includes frameworks, libraries, integrated development environments (IDEs), build tools, and related projects.

== Kotlin frameworks ==
- Arrow – functional programming framework
- Jetpack Compose – modern Android UI toolkit written in Kotlin
- Ktor – asynchronous web framework developed by JetBrains
- Micronaut – modern microservices framework with Kotlin
- Quarkus – Kubernetes-native Java framework optimized for GraalVM and Kotlin
- Spring Framework – major Java framework that provides full Kotlin support

== Libraries ==
- Clikt – command-line interface toolkit
- Exposed – Kotlin object-relational mapping framework by JetBrains
- Fuel – Kotlin HTTP networking library
- Kodein – dependency injection framework
- Koin – lightweight dependency injection library
- Kotlin standard library – core APIs for Kotlin on the JVM, JavaScript, and Native platforms
- Kotlinx.atomicfu – atomic operations for concurrent programming
- Kotlinx.collections.immutable – persistent collection library
- Kotlinx.coroutines – library for asynchronous programming and coroutine support
- Kotlinx.datetime – modern date and time API
- Kotlinx.serialization – multiplatform JSON and binary serialization
- OkHttp – popular HTTP client used with Kotlin and Java
- Okio – I/O library used in many Kotlin projects
- Realm – mobile database with Kotlin API
- Retrofit – type-safe HTTP client for Android and Kotlin
- TornadoFX – JavaFX framework

== Machine learning and AI ==
- Deeplearning4j – JVM-based deep learning framework usable with Kotlin
- KotlinDL – deep learning library from JetBrains, built on TensorFlow, inspired by Keras
- Smile – machine learning library for JVM languages including Kotlin

== Build tools and package managers ==
- Gradle – build automation tool with Kotlin DSL for build scripts
- JitPack – package repository supporting Kotlin and Java projects
- Kobalt – build automation tool inspired by Gradle, written in Kotlin.
- Maven – supported build system projects
- TeamCity – continuous integration server from JetBrains with Kotlin DSL for pipelines

== Integrated development environments ==
- Android Studio – official IDE for Android development, supports Kotlin by default.
- Eclipse IDE – supports Kotlin via plug-ins
- Fleet – next-generation IDE from JetBrains with Kotlin focus
- IntelliJ IDEA – flagship IDE by JetBrains, with full Kotlin support.
- Visual Studio Code – lightweight editor with Kotlin extensions

=== Online IDEs ===
- JDoodle – online compiler and runner for Kotlin code.
- Replit – browser-based IDE supporting Kotlin.

== Kotlin runtimes, compilers, and platforms ==
- GraalVM – supports Kotlin as a JVM language for native image generation.
- K2 – official compiler by JetBrains (JVM, JS, Native)
- Kotlin/JS – transpiles Kotlin code to JavaScript
- Kotlin/JVM – Kotlin compiled to Java bytecode for the JVM
- Kotlin Multiplatform – share code across Android, iOS, desktop, and web targets.
- Kotlin/Native – compiles Kotlin directly to machine code using LLVM

== Testing and quality assurance ==
- AssertK – assertion library
- Detekt – static code analysis
- JUnit 5 – fully compatible with Kotlin
- Kotest – unit testing and property-based testing framework
- ktlint – automatic code style and linting tool
- MockK – mocking framework designed
- Spek – Behavior-driven development (BDD) testing framework
- SonarQube – supports Kotlin static code analysis

== Debugging and profiling tools ==
- Android Profiler – built into Android Studio for profiling Kotlin Android apps
- JProfiler – commercial profiler with Kotlin compatibility
- Kotlin REPL – interactive shell for quick code testing
- VisualVM – profiling and performance analysis for JVM-based Kotlin apps

== Documentation and learning tools ==
- Dokka – documentation engine for Kotlin, similar to Javadoc
- Hyperskill – Kotlin programming curriculum for Kotlin and other programming languages
- Kotlin Koans – interactive exercises for learning Kotlin
- Kotlin Playground – official browser-based code runner
- Kotlin online compiler – online integrated development environment

== Other ==
- Compose Multiplatform – UI toolkit by JetBrains for desktop, Android, and web.
- Kotlin scripting – embedded scripting support for Kotlin files .kts
- KSP (Kotlin Symbol Processing) – compiler plugin API for annotation processing

== See also ==
- Java (programming language)
- List of Java software and tools
- Lists of programming software development tools
- List of JVM languages
