= DWR =

DWR may stand for:

== Businesses and organisations ==
- California Department of Water Resources, a department of the California Natural Resources Agency
- Duke of Wellington's Regiment, a former regiment of the British Army
- Design Within Reach, a retail subsidiary of American furniture maker Herman Miller (manufacturer)

== People ==
- D. W. Robertson Jr. (1914–1992), American medieval literature scholar

== Technology ==
- Direct Web Remoting, a Java open source library
- Durable water repellent, a type of fabric coating
