= Google juice =

Google juice may refer to

- A colloquial name for the value afforded to incoming web links by PageRank, the Google search algorithm
- Google Guice, an open source software framework for the Java platform
