= Micronauts (disambiguation) =

Micronauts was a toy line manufactured and marketed by Mego Corporation from 1976 to 1980.

Micronauts, The Micronauts or Micronaut may also refer to:

- Micronauts (comics), based on the toy line
- Micronauts (animated series), also based on the toy line
- The Micronauts, a French dance music act
- The Micronauts, a series of unrelated novels by Gordon Williams
- The Micronauts, an unmade film that film producer Harry Saltzman struggled to make throughout the 1970s
- Micronaut, a side project by musician Chris Randall
- Micronaut (framework), a microservices application framework for the Java software platform
