= LAPACK++ =

C++ software for numerical linear algebra

- Stable release: 2.5.4 / 10 November 2010; 15 years ago
- Written in: C++
- Type: Software library
- License: GNU Lesser General Public License (LGPL)
- Website: sourceforge.net/projects/lapackpp/

LAPACK++, the Linear Algebra PACKage in C++, is a computer software library of algorithms for numerical linear algebra that solves systems of linear equations and eigenvalue problems.

It supports various matrix classes for vectors, non-symmetric matrices, SPD matrices, symmetric matrices, banded, triangular, and tridiagonal matrices. However, it does not include all of the capabilities of original LAPACK library.

== History ==
The original LAPACK++ (up to v1.1a) was written by R. Pozo et al. at the University of Tennessee and Oak Ridge National Laboratory. In 2000, R. Pozo et al. left the project, with the projects' web page stating LAPACK++ would be superseded by the Template Numerical Toolkit (TNT).

The current LAPACK++ (versions 1.9 onwards) started off as a fork from the original LAPACK++. There are extensive fixes and changes, such as more wrapper functions for LAPACK and BLAS routines.

== See also ==
- List of numerical analysis software
- List of numerical libraries
- List of open-source mathematical libraries
