= Diagrams.net =

Web based diagram editor

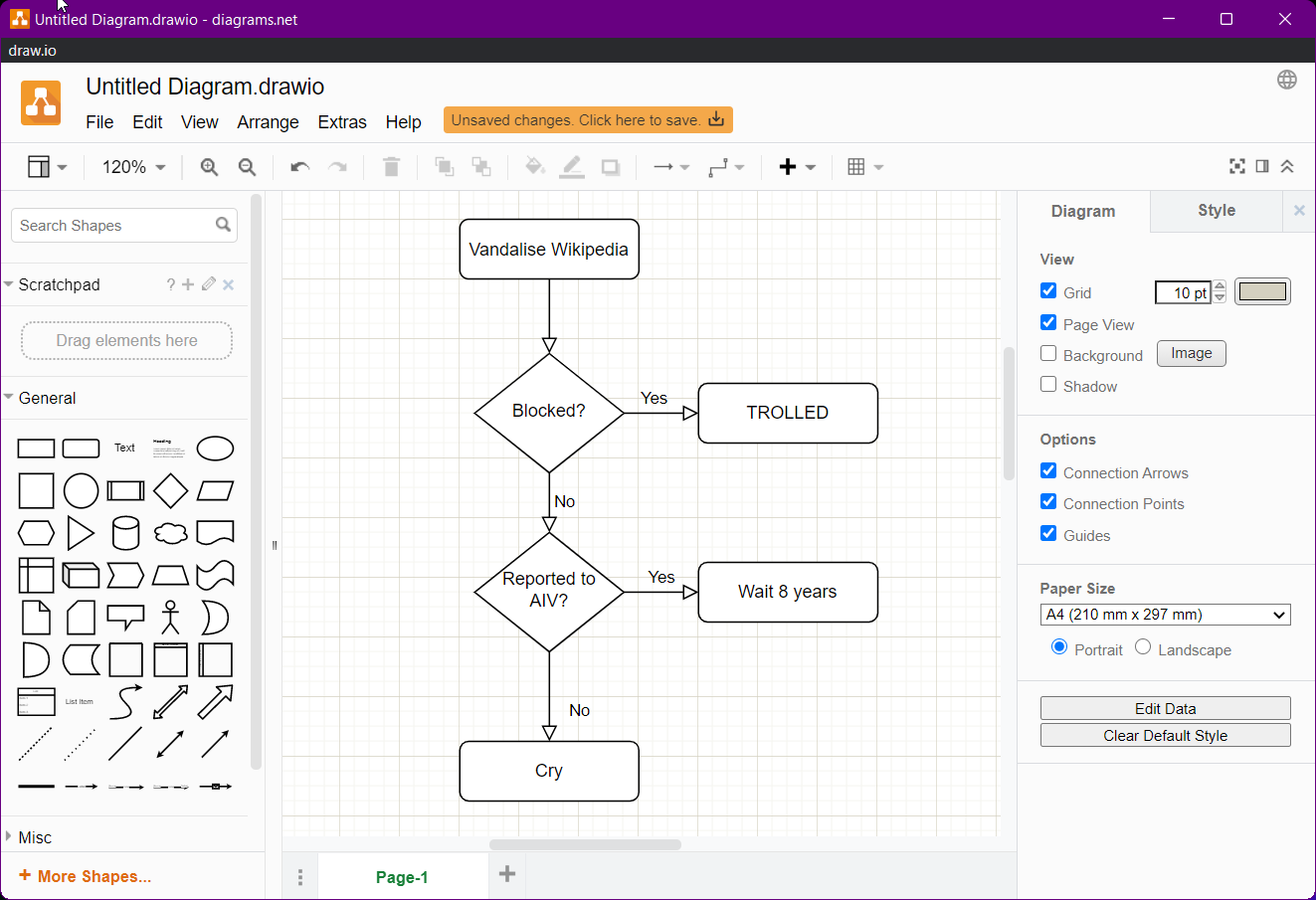
- Diagrams.net version 14.6.13
- Original author: Gaudenz Alder
- Developer: JGraph Ltd
- Stable release: 31.4.5 / 8 September 2026; 4 days ago
- Written in: HTML5, JavaScript
- Engine: Electron
- Type: graph drawing
- License: Apache 2.0
- Website: Project: drawio.com App: app.diagrams.net
- Repository: https://github.com/jgraph/drawio

diagrams.net (previously draw.io) is a graph drawing application written in JavaScript. It can be used to design and export many kinds of diagrams, including circuit diagrams, floor plans, flowcharts, infographics, mind maps, and UML designs. Users can run the software as a web application, or by downloading and installing a standalone desktop program. Neither version requires online login or registration. Technology publications such as TechRadar and PCMag have described diagrams.net as an alternative to Lucidchart, Microsoft Visio, and SmartDraw.

== History ==
=== Corporate history ===
In the fall of 2000, a private limited company called Pimuzar Limited was incorporated for British developer David Benson and one of his colleagues. The company, whose name was later changed to JGraph Ltd in August 2004 and to draw.io Ltd in September 2025, supports the development and maintenance of draw.io and assists commercial users of the software. David Benson remained a company officer and active contributor as of 2025.

=== Product history ===
==== JGraph (2000–2010) ====
draw.io is based on an earlier project called JGraph. Gaudenz Alder, a Swiss software engineer studying at ETH Zurich, began developing JGraph in 2000 as part of a Bachelor's thesis in computer science entitled 'JGraph: A Swing Component for Visualizing Graphs'. Alder originally intended JGraph to serve as a pure Java architectural extension of the Swing toolkit and its JTree class. After the public release of JGraph in May 2002, its popularity grew rapidly, and by late 2004 Alder was working on the project full-time. The final version of JGraph, version 5.14.0, was released in February 2010.

==== mxGraph (2005–2020) ====
Around the same time, a graph drawing software library was written in JavaScript using HTML5 and SVG technologies. The project, called mxGraph, was publicly released in 2006 with support for Firefox 1.5 and Internet Explorer 5.5.

mxGraph was originally made available as freeware through a demonstration webapp. Users could access the publicly available source under a end-user license agreement for non-commercial use with the option to purchase a commercial license.

In 2009, mxGraph was open sourced under the Apache License. JGraph also bundled official ports of mxGraph in other languages including Java, C#, and PHP.

The final version of mxGraph was released in October 2020. The corresponding GitHub repository was archived and became read-only the following year.

==== JGraphX (2012–2020) ====
After the JGraph project was discontinued, the Java-language application was integrated with the mxGraph library to create a new program called JGraphX. JGraphX used the same version numbering as mxGraph, and was first released in 2012 as version 1.10.0.5.

==== Diagramly / draw.io / diagrams.net (2011–present) ====
In 2011, the company announced a hosted service for the mxGraph web application under a separate brand name, Diagramly, at the domain "diagram.ly".

In 2012, after discontinuing the use of Java applets within the application, the service was rebranded as draw.io. Co-founder David Benson explained in a 2012 interview that the name was changed because the ".io suffix is a lot cooler than .ly".

In February 2020, the company announced on its blog that the project website would be moving from the "draw.io" domain to "drawio.com", while the reference implementation of the web application would move to the "diagrams.net" domain. They explained that the move was a precautionary response to a security incident with the .io top-level domain, and also remarked that "the islands which should own the domain suffix, don’t, thanks to a wonderful piece of modern day British Imperialism." The move was completed a month later. The software library, file format, and integrated services remain branded as "drawio".

Starting in August 2024 with draw.io version 24.7.8, the company added a clause to the product's Apache 2.0 license that prohibited use of the software in Atlassian Confluence and Jira products; this was done to protect sales of their own Confluence integration. The project reverted to the Apache 2.0 license by December 2024 with version 25.0.2.

In December 2024, the company replaced some source files in its GitHub repository with minified versions. It is not open source and will generally not accept patches from non-maintainers.

== Features ==
Diagrams can be saved as XML files for later editing. Finished diagrams can be exported to a variety of formats, including vector (SVG) and raster (JPEG, PNG) images, PDF documents, or as embedded HTML.

The software integrates with cloud services for storage including Dropbox, OneDrive, Google Drive, GitHub, and GitLab.com.

It is also available as plugin to embed the web app in platforms such as Nextcloud, MediaWiki, Notion, Atlassian Confluence, and Jira.

== See also ==
- Mermaid (software)
- Microsoft Visio
- Dia (software)
- NetworkX, a Python library for studying graphs and networks.
- JUNG
