= Parallel Colt =

Collection of libraries for Java

- Original author: Piotr Wendykier
- Stable release: 0.9.4 / March 21, 2010
- Operating system: Cross-platform
- Type: Library
- License: Various
- Website: sites.google.com/site/piotrwendykier/software/parallelcolt

Parallel Colt is a set of multithreaded version of Colt. It is a collection of open-source libraries for High Performance Scientific and Technical Computing written in Java. It contains all the original capabilities of Colt and adds several new ones, with a focus on multi-threaded algorithms.

== Capabilities ==
Parallel Colt has all the capabilities of the original Colt library, with the following additions.

- Multithreading
- Specialized Matrix data structures
- JPlasma
  - Java port of PLASMA (Parallel Linear Algebra for Scalable Multi-core Architectures).
- CSparseJ
  - CSparseJ is a Java port of CSparse (a Concise Sparse matrix package).
- Netlib-java
  - Netlib is a collection of mission-critical software components for linear algebra systems (i.e. working with vectors or matrices).
- Solvers and preconditioners
  - Mostly adapted from Matrix Toolkit Java
- Nonlinear Optimization
  - Java translations of the 1-dimensional minimization routine from the MINPACK
- Matrix reader/writer
- All classes that use floating-point arithmetic are implemented in single and double precision.
- Parallel quicksort algorithm

== Usage example ==
Example of singular value decomposition (SVD):

DenseDoubleAlgebra alg = new DenseDoubleAlgebra();
DenseDoubleSingularValueDecomposition s = alg.svd(matA);

DoubleMatrix2D U = s.getU();
DoubleMatrix2D S = s.getS();
DoubleMatrix2D V = s.getV();

Example of matrix multiplication:

DenseDoubleAlgebra alg = new DenseDoubleAlgebra();
DoubleMatrix2D result = alg.mult(matA,matB);

== See also ==
- List of open-source mathematical libraries
