= Neuroph =

Software framework

- Stable release: 2.98 / June 2, 2020; 6 years ago
- Written in: Java
- Platform: Java platform
- Available in: English
- Type: Neural network
- License: Apache License
- Website: neuroph.sourceforge.net

Neuroph is an object-oriented artificial neural network framework written in Java. It can be used to create and train neural networks in Java programs. Neuroph provides Java class library as well as GUI tool easyNeurons for creating and training neural networks.

It is an open-source project hosted at SourceForge under the Apache License. Versions before 2.4 were licensed under LGPL 3, from this version the license is Apache 2.0 License.

== Features ==
Neuroph's core classes correspond to basic neural network concepts like artificial neuron, neuron layer, neuron connections, weight, transfer function, input function, learning rule etc. Neuroph supports common neural network architectures such as Multilayer perceptron with Backpropagation, Kohonen and Hopfield networks. All these classes can be extended and customized to create custom neural networks and learning rules. Neuroph has built-in support for image recognition.

== See also ==
- Comparison of deep learning software
- List of Java software and tools
- Neural network
- SOM or Kohonen
- Retropropagation
