= Joget Workflow =

Web-based software

- Developer: Joget, Inc.
- Stable release: v6.0.2 / January 30, 2018
- Operating system: Windows, Linux, Unix, Solaris
- Type: Workflow, BPM, Rapid application development
- License: GPL
- Website: Joget Workflow

Joget Workflow is an open-source web-based workflow software to develop workflow and business process management applications.

It is also a rapid application development platform that offers full-fledged agile development capabilities (consisting of processes, forms, lists, CRUD and UI), not just back-end EAI/orchestration/integration or the task-based interface.

Joget Workflow is implemented using Java Spring Framework and is deployed on Apache Tomcat server.

== See also ==
- Business Process Management
- Workflow
- Rapid Application Development
