= Eclipse Jersey =

Software framework

Project Jersey
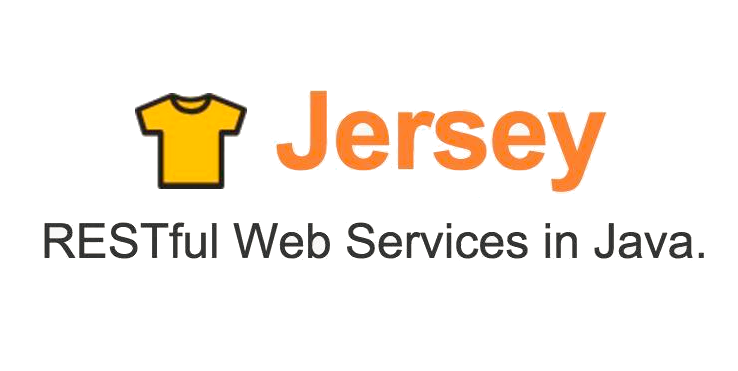
- Developers: Oracle Corporation and Eclipse Foundation
- Stable release: 4.0.0 / November 5, 2025; 19 days ago
- Repository: github.com/eclipse-ee4j/jersey/
- Written in: Java (programming language)
- Operating system: Cross-platform
- Available in: Java 7 or later
- Type: Web framework
- License: Eclipse Public License 2.0
- Website: projects.eclipse.org/projects/ee4j.jersey/

The Jersey RESTful Web Services, formerly Glassfish Jersey, currently Eclipse Jersey, framework is an open source framework for developing RESTful Web Services in Java. It provides support for JAX-RS APIs and serves as a JAX-RS (JSR 311 & JSR 339 & JSR 370) Reference Implementation.

== Overview ==
The following components are part of Jersey:

- Core Server: For building RESTful services based on annotation (jersey-core, jersey-server, jsr311-api)
- Core Client: Aids you in communicating with REST services (jersey-client)
- JAXB support
- JSON support
- Integration module for Spring and Guice
