= JPOS =

jPOS
- Developer: Alejandro Revilla
- Stable release: 1.9.2 / 2013-08-03
- Preview release: 1.9.0 / 2013-03-02
- Written in: Java
- Operating system: Cross-platform
- Type: Library
- License: AGPLv3
- Website: jpos.org

Released in 2013, JPOS is a free and open source library/framework point-of-sale (POS) software project of JPOS.org.

== Funtionality ==
The software system serves as the messaging method for financial systems exchanging electronic transactions made by cardholders using payment cards and bridges the transaction between credit/debit card transaction messages generated at point of sale or ATM terminals and internal systems along the global financial messaging network.

It can be used to implement financial interchanges based on the ISO 8583 standard and related protocols and currently supports versions 1987, 1993 and 2003 of the standard as well as multiple ANSX9.24 standards.

As such, it serves as the messaging foundation for systems that exchange electronic transactions made by cardholders using payment cards. jPOS can be used to document data associated with these transactions.

== POS Device Standards ==
As of Jan 10, 2023, there are two global standards for processing POS device messages/transactions.

1. OPOS (OLE for Retail POS) - is for equipment using Microsoft Windows and was developed by a consortium between Microsoft, NCR, Epson, and Fujitsu-ICL. The standard is governed by the Association for Retail Technology Standards.
2. JPOS (Java for POS Devices) - is a standard for interfacing POS software, written in Java, with the specialized hardware peripherals typically used to create a POS system. JPOS is operating system independent (i.e. Microsoft Windows) and is free to use and modify.

In Jun 2025, Transactility, Inc, in Boca Raton, Florida, which is the marketing company for JPOS, announced the newest release of JPOS 3.
