= JHipster =

Web application generator

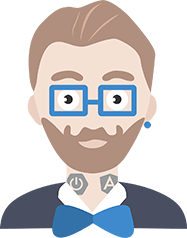
- Original JHipster logo
- Developers: Julien Dubois and contributors
- Release: 21 October 2013; 12 years ago
- Stable release: 9.2.0 / July 10, 2026; 2 months ago
- Written in: Java
- Operating system: Cross-platform
- Type: Web application framework
- License: Apache 2 License
- Website: www.jhipster.tech
- Repository: github.com/jhipster/generator-jhipster

JHipster is a free and open-source application generator used to quickly develop modern web applications and Microservices using Angular or React (JavaScript library) and the Spring Framework.

== Overview ==
JHipster provides tools to generate a project with a Java stack on the server side (using Spring Boot) and a responsive Web front-end on the client side (with Angular/React and Bootstrap). It can also create microservice stack with support for Netflix OSS, Docker and Kubernetes.

The term 'JHipster' comes from 'Java Hipster', as its initial goal was to use all the modern and 'hype' tools available at the time. Today, it has reached a more enterprise goal, with a strong focus on developer productivity, tooling and quality.

== Major functionalities ==
- Generate full stack applications and microservices, with many options
- Generate CRUD entities, directly or by scaffolding
- Database migrations with Liquibase
- NoSQL databases support (Cassandra, MongoDB, Neo4j)
- Elasticsearch support
- Websockets support
- Automatic deployment to CloudFoundry, Heroku, OpenShift, AWS

== Technology stack ==
On the client side:

- HTML5 Boilerplate
- Twitter Bootstrap
- AngularJS
- Angular 2+
- React
- Full internationalization support with Angular Translate
- Optional Compass / Sass support for CSS design
- Optional WebSocket support with Spring Websocket

On the server side:

- Spring Boot
- Spring Security (including Social Logins)
- Spring MVC REST + Jackson
- Monitoring with Metrics
- Optional WebSocket support with Spring Websocket
- Spring Data JPA + Bean Validation
- Database updates with Liquibase
- Elasticsearch support
- MongoDB support
- Cassandra support
- Neo4j support

Out-of-the-box auto-configured tooling:

- Yeoman
- Webpack or Gulp.js
- BrowserSync
- Maven or Gradle
- Editor for Datamodeling (visual and textual)

== Books ==
A JHipster mini book is written by Matt Raible, the author of AppFuse.

A book on "Full stack development with JHipster" is written by Deepu K Sasidharan, the co-lead of JHipster and Sendil Kumar N, a core team member of JHipster. Reviewed by Julien Dubois and Antonio Goncalves.

== See also ==
- MEAN (software bundle)
