= Modular Audio Recognition Framework =

Modular Audio Recognition Framework (MARF)
- Developers: Serguei A. Mokhov, Stephen Sinclair, Ian Clement, Dimitrios Nicolacopoulos, The MARF Research and Development Group
- Stable release: snapshot-0.3.0-devel-20070108 / January 8, 2007
- Repository: marf.cvs.sourceforge.net/viewvc/marf/
- Operating system: Any with the JVM installed
- Type: Pattern recognition, Artificial intelligence, Signal processing, Software frameworks
- License: BSD
- Website: sourceforge.net/projects/marf

Modular Audio Recognition Framework (MARF) is an open-source research platform and a collection of voice, sound, speech, text and natural language processing (NLP) algorithms written in Java and arranged into a modular and extensible framework that attempts to facilitate addition of new algorithms. MARF may act as a library in applications or be used as a source for learning and extension. A few example applications are provided to show how to use the framework. There is also a detailed manual and the API reference in the javadoc format as the project tends to be well documented. MARF, its applications, and the corresponding source code and documentation are released under the BSD-style license.
