= Java Astrodynamics Toolkit =

Library of components for use in spaceflight software

Java Astrodynamics Toolkit (JAT)
- Developer(s): The University of Texas at Austin
- Stable release: 1.3 / January 2002
- Operating system: Windows, Unix
- Type: Numerical computing
- License: Apache License 2.0
- Website: jat.sourceforge.net

The Java Astrodynamics Toolkit (JAT) is an open-source library of software components for use in spaceflight applications written in Java or Matlab. It provides features useful when solving problems in astrodynamics, space mission design, and the navigation, guidance and control of spacecraft.

The software, used by NASA, is a major collaboration by the University of Texas Computer Science department for use by professional computer astronomers. As of 2008 it was one of the most advanced astronomical toolkits available.

== See also ==
- List of Java frameworks
