= Librsb =

LIBRSB
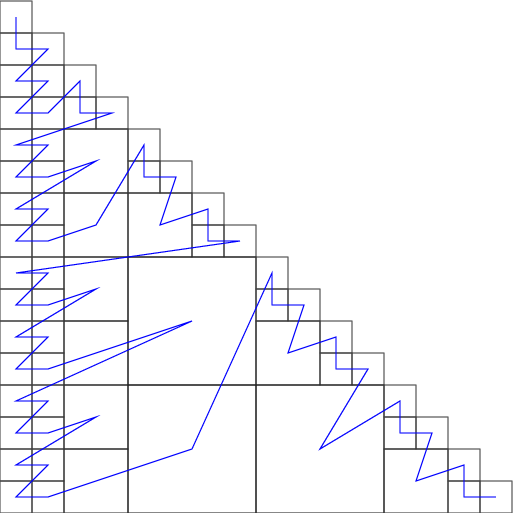
- Original author: Michele Martone
- Stable release: 1.2.0 / September 2016
- Operating system: Cross-platform
- Available in: C, C++, Fortran
- Type: Software library
- License: GPL License
- Website: librsb.sourceforge.net

librsb is an open-source parallel library for sparse matrix computations using the Recursive Sparse Blocks (RSB) matrix format.

librsb provides cache efficient multi-threaded Sparse BLAS operations via OpenMP, and is best suited to large sparse matrices.

== Features ==
librsb provides:

- Conversion from/to COO, CSR, CSC sparse matrix formats.
- Support for the four BLAS types.
- Support for general, symmetric, hermitian matrices.
- Parallel threaded, eventually strided:
  - Sparse matrix-vector multiplication.
  - Sparse matrix-dense matrix multiplication.
  - Sparse matrix-vector triangular solve.
  - Sparse matrix-dense matrix triangular solve.
- Sparse matrix-sparse matrix multiplication.
- Elemental sparse matrix operations (scaling, add, etc.).
- Row-wise or column-wise scaling.
- Rows / columns extraction.
- An online empirical autotuning function.
- File input/output in the Matrix Market format.
- Rendering of the RSB structure into EPS (Encapsulated Postscript) figures.
- A program for benchmarking / testing performance.
- Implements the Sparse BLAS standard, as specified in the BLAS Technical Forum. documents.

== System requirements ==
librsb can be used from:

- C and C++ (rsb.h interface)
- Fortran 90/95/2003 (module rsb)
- GNU Octave (sparsersb package for GNU Octave) GNU Octave package

== See also ==
- List of open-source mathematical libraries
