= GeoAPI =

GIS software

- Developer: Open Geospatial Consortium
- Stable release: 3.0.2 / January 24, 2023; 2 years ago
- Repository: github.com/opengeospatial/geoapi/tree/master
- Written in: Java
- Operating system: Cross-platform
- Type: GIS toolkit
- License: Apache-2.0 license
- Website: http://www.geoapi.org/

GeoAPI is free software providing a set of Java interfaces for GIS applications. GeoAPI interfaces are derived from the abstract model and concrete specifications published collaboratively by the International Organization for Standardization (ISO) in its 19100 series of documents and the Open Geospatial Consortium (OGC) in its abstract and implementation specifications. GeoAPI provides an interpretation and adaptation of these standards to match the constraints and usages of the target programming language. The international standards translated to Java interfaces are:

- ISO/TS 19103:2005 — Conceptual schema language
- ISO 19115:2003 — Metadata
- ISO 19115-2:2009 — Metadata — Part 2: Extensions for imagery and gridded data
- ISO 19111:2007 — Spatial referencing by coordinates

GeoAPI 3.0 has been approved as an OGC standard and is published as an OGC implementation specification. The Java Archive Files are available from the Apache Maven central repository. The Java interfaces are defined in org.opengis packages.

== History ==
The first public release of Java interfaces in org.opengis packages was in the OpenGIS Coordinate Transformation Service Implementation Specification standard, published on January 12, 2001. This standard is retrospectively named GeoAPI 1.0.

Developers of Open Source projects joined later, following a public email calling for the creation of a geospatial API in October 2002. OGC created a GeoAPI Standard Working Group and published GeoAPI 2.0 in June 2005.

The OGC GeoAPI working has been dissolved in June 2006, but recreated as GeoAPI 3 in January 2009. OGC released GeoAPI 3.0 in June 2011, followed by 3.0.1 in 2017 and 3.0.2 in 2023.

The GeoTools project participated to GeoAPI 2, but quitted before GeoAPI 3. GeoTools created a fork of GeoAPI interfaces but kept the org.opengis namespace, which caused incompatibilities with OGC standard releases. The conflict has been resolved in October 2023 with the GeoTools 30 release.

== See also ==
- Open Geospatial Consortium – a standards organization
