= JUNG =

- Developers: Joshua O'Madadhain, Tom Nelson, Danyel Fisher, Scott White
- Stable release: 2.1.1 / September 7, 2016
- Preview release: 3.0 / January 6, 2020
- Written in: Java
- Operating system: Cross-platform
- Type: network theory, social network analysis, graph drawing
- License: BSD license
- Website: https://jrtom.github.io/jung/

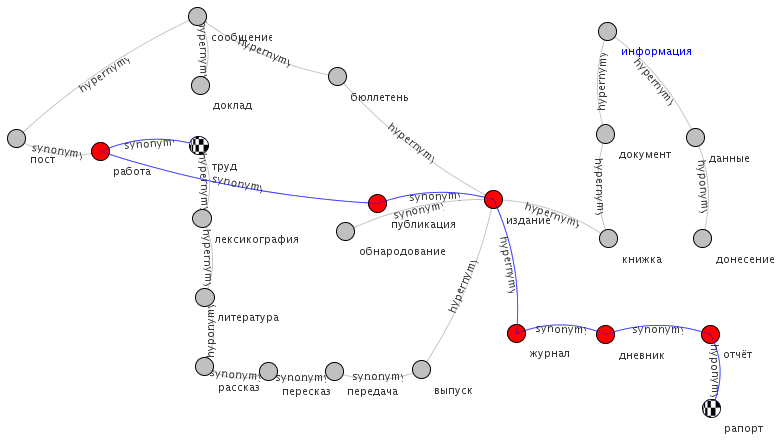
A shortest path from a Russian word "рапорт" (raport) to a word "труд" (work, labour) found in a thesaurus of the Russian Wiktionary by the Dijkstra's algorithm. A shortest path computation on a graph was implemented within the JUNG.

JUNG (the Java Universal Network/Graph Framework) is an open-source graph modeling and visualization framework written in Java, under the BSD license. The framework comes with a number of layout algorithms built in, as well as analysis algorithms such as graph clustering and metrics for node centrality.

JUNG's architecture is designed to support a variety of representations of entities and their relations, such as directed and undirected graphs, multi-modal graphs, graphs with parallel edges, and hypergraphs. It provides a mechanism for annotating graphs, entities, and relations with metadata. JUNG also facilitates the creation of analytic tools for complex data sets that can examine the relations between entities as well as the metadata attached to each entity and relation. JUNG includes implementations of a number of algorithms from graph theory, data mining, and social network analysis, such as routines for clustering, decomposition, optimization, random graph generation, statistical analysis, and calculation of network distances, flows, and importance measures.

JUNG provides a visualization framework that makes it easy to construct tools for the interactive exploration of network data. Users can use one of the layout algorithms provided, or use the framework to create their own custom layouts. In addition, filtering mechanisms are provided which allow users to focus their attention, or their algorithms, on specific portions of the graph.

== See also ==
- JGraph
