= Jackson (library) =

High-performance JSON processor for Java

- Stable release: 2.19.2 / July 18, 2025; 13 months ago
- Operating system: Cross-platform
- Type: API for JSON
- License: Apache License 2.0

In computing, Jackson is a high-performance JSON processor for Java. Its developers extol the combination of fast, correct, lightweight, and ergonomic attributes of the library.

== Implementation ==
Jackson provides multiple approaches to working with JSON, including using binding annotations on POJO classes for simple use cases.

== Usage example ==
Sample code for reading and writing with POJOs may look like the following:

package org.wikipedia.examples;

import java.io.IOException;

import com.fasterxml.jackson.databind.ObjectMapper;

record Person(int id, String firstName, String lastName) {}

public class ReadWriteJackson {
    public static void main(String[] args) throws IOException {
        ObjectMapper mapper = new ObjectMapper();
   
        String jsonInput = "{\"id\":0,\"firstName\":\"Robin\",\"lastName\":\"Wilson\"}";
        Person q = mapper.readValue(jsonInput, Person.class);
        System.out.printf("Read and parsed Person from JSON: %s%n", q);
   
        Person p = new Person(1, "Roger", "Rabbit");
        System.out.printf("Person object %s as JSON =%n", p);
        mapper.writeValue(System.out, p);
    }
}
