= Apache Oozie =

Workflow scheduler for Apache Hadoop

- Developer: Apache Software Foundation
- Stable release: 5.2.1 / 26 February 2021; 5 years ago
- Written in: Java, JavaScript
- Operating system: Cross-platform
- Platform: Java virtual machine
- License: Apache License 2.0
- Website: oozie.apache.org
- Repository: Oozie Repository

Apache Oozie is a server-based workflow scheduling system to manage Hadoop jobs.

Workflows in Oozie are defined as a collection of control flow and action nodes in a directed acyclic graph. Control flow nodes define the beginning and the end of a workflow (start, end, and failure nodes) as well as a mechanism to control the workflow execution path (decision, fork, and join nodes). Action nodes are the mechanism by which a workflow triggers the execution of a computation/processing task. Oozie provides support for different types of actions including Hadoop MapReduce, Hadoop distributed file system operations, Pig, SSH, and email. Oozie can also be extended to support additional types of actions.

Oozie workflows can be parameterised using variables such as ${inputDir} within the workflow definition. When submitting a workflow job, values for the parameters must be provided. If properly parameterized (using different output directories), several identical workflow jobs can run concurrently.

Oozie is implemented as a Java web application that runs in a Java servlet container and is distributed under the Apache License 2.0.

In February 2025, the Apache Oozie project was officially retired by the Apache Software Foundation.
