= Gson =

Java JSON serialization library

- Developer: Google
- Release: May 22, 2008; 18 years ago
- Stable release: 2.14.0 / 23 April 2026; 5 months ago
- Written in: Java
- Operating system: Cross-platform
- License: Apache License 2.0
- Website: github.com/google/gson
- Repository: github.com/google/gson

Gson, or Google Gson, is an open-source Java library that serializes Java objects to JSON (and deserializes them back to Java).

== History ==
The Gson library was originally developed for internal purposes at Google, with Version 1.0 released on May 22, 2008, under the terms of the Apache License 2.0.

== Usage ==
Gson utilizes reflection, meaning that classes do not have to be modified to be serialized or deserialized. By default, a class only needs a defined default (no-args) constructor; however, this requirement can be circumvented (see Features).

The following example demonstrates the basic usage of Gson when serializing a sample object:

package example;

public class Car {
    public String manufacturer;
    public String model;
    public double capacity;
    public boolean accident;

    public Car() {}

    public Car(String manufacturer, String model, double capacity, boolean accident) {
        this.manufacturer = manufacturer;
        this.model = model;
        this.capacity = capacity;
        this.accident = accident;
    }

    @Override
    public String toString() {
        return "Manufacturer: " + manufacturer + ", " + "Model: " + model + ", " + "Capacity: " + capacity + ", " + "Accident: " + accident;
    }
}

package example;

public class Person {
    public String name;
    public String surname;
    public Car[] cars;
    public int phone;
    public transient int age;

    public Person() {}

    public Person(String name, String surname, int phone, int age, Car[] cars) {
        this.name = name;
        this.surname = surname;
        this.cars = cars;
        this.phone = phone;
        this.age = age;
    }

    @Override
    public String toString() {
        StringBuilder sb = new StringBuilder();
        sb.append("Name: ").append(name).append(" ").append(surname).append("\n");
        sb.append("Phone: ").append(phone).append("\n");
        sb.append("Age: ").append(age).append("\n");
        int i = 0;
        for (Car car : cars) {
            i++;
            sb.append("Car ").append(i).append(": ").append(car).append("\n");
        }
        return sb.toString();
    }
}

package main;

import com.google.gson.Gson;
import com.google.gson.GsonBuilder;
import example.Car;
import example.Person;

public class Main {
    public static void main(String[] args) {
        // Enable pretty printing for demonstration purposes
        // Can also directly create instance with `new Gson()`; this will produce compact JSON
        Gson gson = new GsonBuilder().setPrettyPrinting().create();
        Car audi = new Car("Audi", "A4", 1.8, false);
        Car skoda = new Car("Škoda", "Octavia", 2.0, true);
        Car[] cars = { audi, skoda };
        Person johnDoe = new Person("John", "Doe", 2025550191, 35, cars);
        System.out.println(gson.toJson(johnDoe));
    }
}

Calling the code of the above Main class will result in the following JSON output:

Diagram featuring data from JSON. {   "name": "John",   "surname": "Doe",   "cars": [     {       "manufacturer": "Audi",       "model": "A4",       "capacity": 1.8,       "accident": false     },     {       "manufacturer": "Škoda",       "model": "Octavia",       "capacity": 2.0,       "accident": true     }   ],   "phone": 2025550191 }

Since the Person's field age is marked as transient, it is not included in the output.

package main;

import com.google.gson.Gson;
import example.Person;

public class Main {
    public static void main(String[] args) {
        Gson gson = new Gson();
        String json =
            "{\"name\":\"John\",\"surname\":\"Doe\",\"cars\":[{\"manufacturer\":\"Audi\",\"model\":\"A4\"," +
            "\"capacity\":1.8,\"accident\":false},{\"manufacturer\":\"Škoda\",\"model\":\"Octavia\",\"capacity\"" +
            ":2.0,\"accident\":true}],\"phone\":2025550191}";
        Person johnDoe = gson.fromJson(json, Person.class);
        System.out.println(johnDoe.toString());
    }
}

To deserialize the output produced by the last example, the code above generates the following output:

Name: John Doe
Phone: 2025550191
Age: 0
Car 1: Manufacturer: Audi, Model: A4, Capacity: 1.8, Accident: false
Car 2: Manufacturer: Škoda, Model: Octavia, Capacity: 2.0, Accident: true

This shows how Gson can be used with the Java Platform Module System for the example above:

module GsonExample {
    requires com.google.gson;
    // Open package declared in the example above to allow Gson to use reflection on classes
    // inside the package (and also access non-public fields)
    opens example to com.google.gson;
}

For more extensive examples, see Gson's usage guide on their GitHub repository.

== Features ==
- Gson can handle collections, generic types, and nested classes (including inner classes, which cannot be done by default).
- When deserializing, Gson navigates the type tree of the object being deserialized, which means that it ignores extra fields present in the JSON input.
- The user can:
  - write a custom serializer and/or deserializer so that they can control the whole process, and even deserialize instances of classes for which the source code is inaccessible.
  - write an InstanceCreator, which allows them to deserialize instances of classes without a defined no-args constructor.
- Gson is highly customizable, as the developer can specify:

- Compact/pretty printing (compact or readable output)
- How to handle null object fields — by default they are not present in the output
- Excluding fields — rules of what fields are intended to be excluded from deserialization
- How to convert Java field names
