= Flying Saucer (library) =

Java APIs

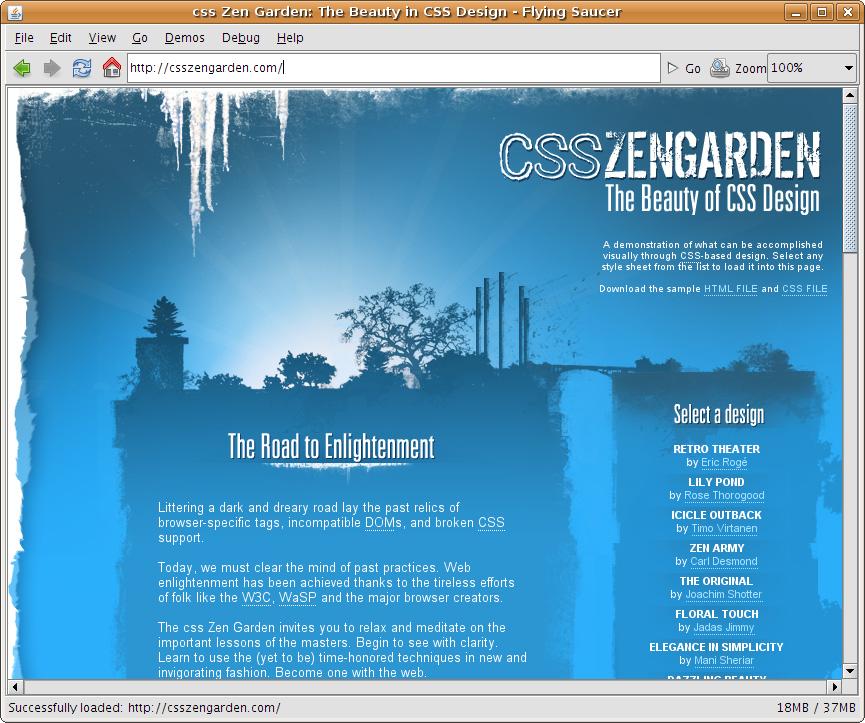
- webpage rendered with Flying Saucer
- Stable release: 10.5.0 / 17 August 2026; 35 days ago
- Operating system: Cross-platform
- Type: XHTML / CSS renderer library
- License: LGPL
- Website: github.com/flyingsaucerproject/flyingsaucer
- Repository: github.com/flyingsaucerproject/flyingsaucer

Flying Saucer (also called XHTML renderer) is a pure Java library for rendering XML, XHTML, and CSS 2.1 content.

It is intended for embedding web-based user interfaces into Java applications, but cannot be used as a general purpose web browser since it does not support HTML.

Thanks to its capability to save rendered XHTML to PDF (using iText), it is often used as a server side library to generate PDF documents. It has extended support for print-related things like pagination and page headers and footers. Current releases produce PDF output through OpenPDF, a fork of iText 2, and can also render to Swing panels, SWT and raster images. Since version 10.0.0 the library requires Java 21 or later.

== History ==
Flying Saucer was started in 2004 by Joshua Marinacci, who was later hired by Sun Microsystems. It is still an open-source project unrelated to Sun.

Sun Microsystems once planned to include Flying Saucer in F3, the scripting language based on the Java platform which later became JavaFX Script.

== Compliance ==
Flying saucer has XHTML markup and CSS 2.1 standards compliance.

== See also ==
- JavaFX
- List of web browsers
