= Efficient Java Matrix Library =

- Original author: Peter Abeles
- Stable release: 0.46.1 / July 31, 2026; 3 months ago
- Operating system: Cross-platform
- Type: Library
- License: Apache License
- Website: ejml.org
- Repository: github.com/lessthanoptimal/ejml

Efficient Java Matrix Library (EJML) is a linear algebra library for manipulating real/complex/dense/sparse matrices. Its design goals are; 1) to be as computationally and memory efficient as possible for both small and large matrices, and 2) to be accessible to both novices and experts. These goals are accomplished by dynamically selecting the best algorithms to use at runtime, clean API, and multiple interfaces. EJML is free, written in 100% Java and has been released under an Apache v2.0 license.

EJML has three distinct ways to interact with it: 1) Procedural, 2) SimpleMatrix, and 3) Equations. The procedural style provides all capabilities of EJML and almost complete control over matrix creation, speed, and specific algorithms. The SimpleMatrix style provides a simplified subset of the core capabilities in an easy-to-use flow-styled object-oriented API, inspired by JAMA. The Equations style provides a symbolic interface, similar in spirit to Matlab and other CAS, that provides a compact way of writing equations.

== Capabilities ==
EJML provides the following capabilities for dense matrices.

- Basic Operators (addition, multiplication, ... )
- Matrix Manipulation (extract, insert, combine, ... )
- Linear Solvers (linear, least squares, incremental, ... )
- Decompositions (LU, QR, Cholesky, SVD, Eigenvalue, ...)
- Matrix Features (rank, symmetric, definitiveness, ... )
- Random Matrices (covariance, orthogonal, symmetric, ... )
- Different Internal Formats (row-major, block)
- Unit Testing

== Usage examples ==
=== Equation style ===
Computing the Kalman gain:

eq.process("K = P*H'*inv( H*P*H' + R )");

=== Procedural style ===
Computing Kalman gain:

mult(H, P, c);
multTransB(c, H, S);
addEquals(S, R);
if (!invert(S, S_inv))
    throw new RuntimeException("Invert failed");
multTransA(H, S_inv, d);
mult(P, d, K);

=== SimpleMatrix style ===
Example of singular value decomposition (SVD):

SimpleSVD s = matA.svd();
SimpleMatrix U = s.getU();
SimpleMatrix W = s.getW();
SimpleMatrix V = s.getV();

Example of matrix multiplication:

SimpleMatrix result = matA.mult(matB);

=== DecompositionFactory ===
Use of a DecompositionFactory to compute a Singular Value Decomposition with a Dense Double Row Major matrix (DDRM):

SingularValueDecomposition_F64<DenseMatrix64F> svd = 
    DecompositionFactory_DDRM.svd(true, true, true);

if (!DecompositionFactory.decomposeSafe(svd, matA))
    throw new DetectedException("Decomposition failed.");

DenseMatrix64F U = svd.getU(null, false);
DenseMatrix64F S = svd.getW(null);
DenseMatrix64F V = svd.getV(null, false);

Example of matrix multiplication:

CommonOps_DDRM.mult(matA, matB, result);

== See also ==
- List of numerical libraries
- List of open-source mathematical libraries
