= Barracuda (web framework) =

Barracuda MVC
- Operating system: Cross-platform
- Type: Web Framework
- License: GLGPL
- Website: Barracuda MVC Home page

Barracuda MVC was an open-source web application framework for developing Java EE web applications that was an alternative to struts. The project is no longer active.

== See also ==
- Model-view-controller
- Apache Struts
- Java EE
- Google Web Toolkit
