= Cascading (software) =

Software abstraction layer for Apache Hadoop and Apache Flink

- Stable release: 3.3.0 / March 24, 2018; 7 years ago
- Preview release: 4.0-wip-120 / March 27, 2021; 4 years ago
- Written in: Java
- License: Apache License v2
- Website: cascading.wensel.net
- Repository: github.com/cwensel/cascading

Cascading is a software abstraction layer for Apache Hadoop and Apache Flink. Cascading is used to create and execute complex data processing workflows on a Hadoop cluster using any JVM-based language (Java, JRuby, Clojure, etc.), hiding the underlying complexity of MapReduce jobs. It is open source and available under the Apache License. Commercial support is available from Driven, Inc.

Cascading was originally authored by Chris Wensel, who later founded Concurrent, Inc, which has been re-branded as Driven. Cascading is being actively developed by the community and a number of add-on modules are available.

== Architecture ==
To use Cascading, Apache Hadoop must also be installed, and the Hadoop job .jar must contain the Cascading .jars. Cascading consists of a data processing API, integration API, process planner and process scheduler.

Cascading leverages the scalability of Hadoop but abstracts standard data processing operations away from underlying map and reduce tasks. Developers use Cascading to create a .jar file that describes the required processes. It follows a ‘source-pipe-sink’ paradigm, where data is captured from sources, follows reusable ‘pipes’ that perform data analysis processes, where the results are stored in output files or ‘sinks’. Pipes are created independent from the data they will process. Once tied to data sources and sinks, it is called a ‘flow’. These flows can be grouped into a ‘cascade’, and the process scheduler will ensure a given flow does not execute until all its dependencies are satisfied. Pipes and flows can be reused and reordered to support different business needs.

Developers write the code in a JVM-based language and do not need to learn MapReduce. The resulting program can be regression tested and integrated with external applications like any other Java application.

Cascading is most often used for ad targeting, log file analysis, bioinformatics, machine learning, predictive analytics, web content mining, and extract, transform and load (ETL) applications.

== Uses of Cascading ==
Cascading was cited as one of the top five most powerful Hadoop projects by SD Times in 2011, as a major open source project relevant to bioinformatics and is included in Hadoop: A Definitive Guide, by Tom White. The project has also been cited in presentations, conference proceedings and Hadoop user group meetings as a useful tool for working with Hadoop and with Apache Spark

- MultiTool on Amazon Web Services was developed using Cascading.
- LogAnalyzer for Amazon CloudFront was developed using Cascading.
- BackType - social analytics platform
- Etsy - marketplace
- FlightCaster - predicting flight delays
- Ion Flux - analyzing DNA sequence data
- RapLeaf - personalization and recommendation systems
- Razorfish - digital advertising

== Domain-Specific Languages Built on Cascading ==
- PyCascading - by Twitter, available on GitHub
- Cascading.jruby - developed by Gregoire Marabout, available on GitHub
- Cascalog - authored by Nathan Marz, available on GitHub
- Scalding - A Scala API for Cascading. Makes it easier to transition Cascading/Scalding code to Spark. By Twitter, available on GitHub
