= Mockito =

- Developers: Szczepan Faber, Brice Dutheil, Rafael Winterhalter, Tim van der Lippe and others.
- Stable release: 5.23.0 / March 11, 2026; 6 months ago
- Written in: Java
- Type: Testing
- License: MIT License
- Website: site.mockito.org
- Repository: github.com/mockito/mockito

Mockito is an open source testing framework for Java released under the MIT License. The framework allows the creation of test double objects (mock objects) in automated unit tests for the purpose of test-driven development (TDD) or behavior-driven development (BDD).

The framework's name and logo are a play on mojitos, a type of drink.

== Features ==
Mockito allows developers to verify the behavior of the system under test (SUT) without establishing expectations beforehand. One of the criticisms of mock objects is that there is a tight coupling of the test code to the system under test. Mockito attempts to eliminate the expect-run-verify pattern by removing the specification of expectations. Mockito also provides some annotations for reducing boilerplate code.

== Origins ==
Mockito began by expanding on the syntax and functionality of EasyMock.

=== Example ===
Consider this decoupled Hello world program; we may unit test some of its parts, using mock objects for other parts.

package org.wikipedia.examples;

import java.io.IOException;

public class HelloApplication {
    public static interface Greeter {
        String getGreeting(String subject);
        String getIntroduction(String actor);
    }

    public static class HelloGreeter implements Greeter {
        private String hello;
        private String segmenter;

        public HelloGreeter(String hello, String segmenter) {
            this.hello = hello;
            this.segmenter = segmenter;
        }

        public String getGreeting(String subject) {
            return String.format("%s %s", hello, subject);
        }

        public String getIntroduction(String actor) {
            return actor + segmenter;
        }
    }

    public static interface HelloActable {
        void sayHello(String actor, String subject) throws IOException;
    }

    public static class HelloAction implements HelloActable {
        private Greeter helloGreeter;
        private Appendable helloWriter;

        public HelloAction(Greeter helloGreeter, Appendable helloWriter) {
            super();
            this.helloGreeter = helloGreeter;
            this.helloWriter = helloWriter;
        }

        public void sayHello(String actor, String subject) throws IOException { 
            helloWriter.append(helloGreeter.getIntroduction(actor)).append(helloGreeter.getGreeting(subject));
        }
    }

    public static void main(String[] args) throws IOException {
        new HelloAction(new HelloGreeter("hello", ": "), System.out).sayHello("application", "world");
    }
}

The result of HelloApplication launching will be the following:

application: hello world

Unit test for HelloActable component may look like this:

package org.wikipedia.examples;

import static org.mockito.Matchers.any;
import static org.mockito.Matchers.eq;
import static org.mockito.Mockito.mock;
import static org.mockito.Mockito.times;
import static org.mockito.Mockito.verify;
import static org.mockito.Mockito.when;

import org.junit.Before;
import org.junit.Test;

import org.wikipedia.examples.HelloApplication.HelloActable;
import org.wikipedia.examples.HelloApplication.HelloAction;
import org.wikipedia.examples.HelloApplication.Greeter;

public class HelloActionUnitTest {
    Greeter helloGreeterMock;
    Appendable helloWriterMock;
    HelloActable helloAction;

    @Before
    public void setUp() {
        helloGreeterMock = mock(Greeter.class);
        helloWriterMock = mock(Appendable.class);
        helloAction = new HelloAction(helloGreeterMock, helloWriterMock);
    }
  
    @Test
    public void testSayHello() throws Exception {
        when(helloWriterMock.append(any(String.class))).thenReturn(helloWriterMock);
        when(helloGreeterMock.getIntroduction(eq("unitTest"))).thenReturn("unitTest : ");
        when(helloGreeterMock.getGreeting(eq("world"))).thenReturn("hi world");

        helloAction.sayHello("unitTest", "world");

        verify(helloGreeterMock).getIntroduction(eq("unitTest"));
        verify(helloGreeterMock).getGreeting(eq("world"));

        verify(helloWriterMock, times(2)).append(any(String.class));
        verify(helloWriterMock, times(1)).append(eq("unitTest : "));
        verify(helloWriterMock, times(1)).append(eq("hi world"));
    }
}

It uses mock objects for the Greeter and Appendable interfaces, and implicitly assumes the next use case:

unitTest : hi world

Integration test code for testing HelloActable wired together with Greeter may look like the following:

package org.wikipedia.examples;

import static org.mockito.Matchers.any;
import static org.mockito.Matchers.eq;
import static org.mockito.Mockito.mock;
import static org.mockito.Mockito.times;
import static org.mockito.Mockito.verify;
import static org.mockito.Mockito.when;

import org.junit.Before;
import org.junit.Test;

import org.wikipedia.examples.HelloApplication.HelloActable;
import org.wikipedia.examples.HelloApplication.HelloAction;
import org.wikipedia.examples.HelloApplication.Greeter;
import org.wikipedia.examples.HelloApplication.HelloGreeter;

public class HelloActionIntegrationTest {
    HelloActable helloAction;
    Greeter helloGreeter;
    Appendable helloWriterMock;

    @Before
    public void setUp() {
        helloGreeter = new HelloGreeter("welcome", " says ");
        helloWriterMock = mock(Appendable.class);
        helloAction = new HelloAction(helloGreeter, helloWriterMock);
    }

    @Test
    public void testSayHello() throws Exception {
        when(helloWriterMock.append(any(String.class))).thenReturn(helloWriterMock);

        helloAction.sayHello("integrationTest", "universe");

        verify(helloWriterMock, times(2)).append(any(String.class));
        verify(helloWriterMock, times(1)).append(eq("integrationTest says "));
        verify(helloWriterMock, times(1)).append(eq("welcome universe"));
    }
}

It uses mock objects only in place of Appendable interfaces, uses the real implementations for other (HelloActable and Greeter) interfaces, and implicitly assumes the next use case:

integrationTest says welcome universe

As can be seen from the import statements of HelloActionUnitTest and HelloActionIntegrationTest classes, it is necessary to put some Mockito jars and JUnit jars in your class path to be able to compile and run the test classes.

== See also ==
- Behavior driven development
- List of unit testing frameworks
- Software testing
