= Jblas: Linear Algebra for Java =

Linear algebra library

- Original author: Mikio L. Braun
- Stable release: 1.2.5 / August 22, 2020
- Operating system: Cross-platform
- Type: Library
- License: BSD Revised
- Website: jblas.org

jblas is a linear algebra library, created by Mikio Braun, for the Java programming language built upon BLAS and LAPACK. Unlike most other Java linear algebra libraries, jblas is designed to be used with native code through the Java Native Interface (JNI) and comes with precompiled binaries. When used on one of the targeted architectures, it will automatically select the correct binary to use and load it. This allows it to be used out of the box and avoid a potentially tedious compilation process. jblas provides an easier to use high level API on top of the archaic API provided by BLAS and LAPACK, removing much of the tediousness.

Since its initial release, jblas has been gaining popularity in scientific computing. With applications in a range of applications, such as text classification, network analysis, and stationary subspace analysis. It is part of software packages, such as JLabGroovy, and Universal Java Matrix Library (UJMP). In a performance study of Java matrix libraries, jblas was the highest performing library, when libraries with native code are considered.

== Capabilities ==
The following is an overview of jblas's capabilities, as listed on the project's website:

- Eigen – eigendecomposition
- Solve – solving linear equations
- Singular – singular value decomposition
- Decompose – LU, Cholesky, ...
- Geometry – centering, normalizing, ...

== Usage example ==
Example of Eigenvalue Decomposition:

DoubleMatrix[] evd = Eigen.symmetricEigenvectors(matA);
DoubleMatrix V = evd[0];
DoubleMatrix D = evd[1];

Example of matrix multiplication:

DoubleMatrix result = matA.mmul(matB);

== See also ==
- NumPy
- SciPy
- ND4J: NDArrays & Scientific Computing for Java
