= OjAlgo =

- Original author: Anders Peterson
- Stable release: v56.1.1 / November 9, 2025
- Written in: Java
- Operating system: Cross-platform
- Platform: Java
- Type: Library
- License: MIT License
- Website: www.ojalgo.org
- Repository: github.com/optimatika/ojAlgo

oj! Algorithms or ojAlgo, is an open source Java library for mathematics, linear algebra and optimisation. It was first released in 2003 and is 100% pure Java source code and free from external dependencies. Its feature set make it particularly suitable for use within the financial domain.

== Capabilities ==
- Linear algebra in Java
  - "high performance" multi-threaded feature-complete linear algebra package.
- Optimisation (mathematical programming) including LP, QP and MIP solvers.
- Finance related code (certainly usable in other areas as well):
  - Extensive set of tools to work with time series - CalendarDateSeries, CoordinationSet & PrimitiveTimeSeries.
  - Random numbers and stochastic processes - even multi-dimensional such - and the ability to drive these to do things like Monte Carlo simulations.
  - A collection of Modern Portfolio Theory related classes - FinancePortfolio and its subclasses the Markowitz and Black-Litterman model implementations.
  - Ability to download data from Yahoo Finance and Google Finance.

It requires Java 8 since version v38. As of version 44.0, the finance specific code has been moved to its own project/module named ojAlgo-finance.

== Usage example ==
Example of singular value decomposition:

SingularValue<Double> svd = SingularValueDecomposition.make(matA);
svd.compute(matA);

MatrixStore<Double> U = svd.getQ1();
MatrixStore<Double> S = svd.getD();
MatrixStore<Double> V = svd.getQ2();

Example of matrix multiplication:

PrimitiveDenseStore result = FACTORY.makeZero(matA.getRowDim(), matB.getColDim());
result.fillByMultiplying(matA, matB);

== See also ==
- List of open-source mathematical libraries
