= SuanShu numerical library =

Java math library

SuanShu
- Stable release: 20120606 / 2012-06-06
- Written in: Java
- Type: Math
- License: Apache License 2.0
- Website: github.com/nmltd/SuanShu

SuanShu is a Java math library. It is open-source under Apache License 2.0 available in GitHub. SuanShu is a large collection of Java classes for basic numerical analysis, statistics, and optimization. It implements a parallel version of the adaptive strassen's algorithm for fast matrix multiplication. SuanShu has been quoted and used in a number of academic works.

== Features ==
- linear algebra
- root finding
- curve fitting and interpolation
- unconstrained and constrained optimization
- statistical analysis
- linear regression
- probability distributions and random number generation
- ordinary and partial differential equation solvers

== License terms ==
SuanShu is released under the terms of the Apache License 2.0

== Examples of usage ==
The following code shows the object-oriented design of the library (in contrast to the traditional procedural design of many other FORTRAN and C numerical libraries) by a simple example of minimization.

LogGamma logGamma = new LogGamma(); // the log-gamma function
BracketSearchMinimizer solver = new BrentMinimizer(1e-8, 10); // precision, max number of iterations
UnivariateMinimizer.Solution soln = solver.solve(logGamma); // optimization
double x_min = soln.search(0, 5); // bracket = [0, 5]
System.out.println(String.format("f(%f) = %f", x_min, logGamma.evaluate(x_min)));

== See also ==
- SOCP - Explanation of Second Order Conic Programming
- SDP - Explanation of Semidefinite Programming
- SQP - Explanation of Sequential quadratic programming
- Interior Point Method
- Adaptive strassen's algorithm – fast matrix multiplication
- Apache License 2.0 - Version 2 of the Apache Software License
