= Colt (libraries) =

- Original author: NIST
- Stable release: 1.2.0 / September 9, 2004
- Operating system: Cross-platform
- Type: Library
- License: CERN and LGPL
- Website: acs.lbl.gov/software/colt/

Colt is a set of open-source libraries for high-performance scientific and technical computing written in Java and developed at CERN. Colt was developed with a focus on high energy physics, but is applicable to many other problems. Colt was last updated in 2004 (when Java 1.4 was the current release) and its code base has been incorporated into the Parallel Colt code base, which has received more recent development.

Colt contains, among other things, data structures and algorithms for offline and online data analysis, linear algebra, multi-dimensional arrays, statistics, histogramming, Monte Carlo simulation, and parallel & concurrent programming.

== Capabilities ==
The following is an overview of Colt's capabilities, as listed on the project's website:

Feature	Description
Templated Lists and Maps	Dynamically resizing lists holding objects or primitive data types such as int, double, etc. Operations on primitive arrays, algorithms on Colt lists and JAL algorithms (see below) can freely be mixed at zero copy overhead. More details. Automatically growing and shrinking maps holding objects or primitive data types such as int, double, etc.
Templated Multi-dimensional matrices	Dense and sparse fixed sized (non-resizable) 1,2, 3 and d-dimensional matrices holding objects or primitive data types such as int, double, etc.; Also known as multi-dimensional arrays or Data Cubes.
Linear Algebra	Standard matrix operations and decompositions. LU, QR, Cholesky, Eigenvalue, Singular value.
Histogramming	Compact, extensible, modular and performant histogramming functionality. AIDA offers the histogramming features of HTL and HBOOK.
Mathematics	Tools for basic and advanced mathematics: Arithmetics and Algebra, Polynomials and Chebyshev series, Bessel and Airy functions, Constants and Units, Trigonometric functions, etc.
Statistics	Tools for basic and advanced statistics: Estimators, Gamma functions, Beta functions, Probabilities, Special integrals, etc.
Random Numbers and Random Sampling	Strong yet quick. Partly a port of CLHEP.
util.concurrent	Efficient utility classes commonly encountered in parallel & concurrent programming.

== Usage example ==
Example of singular value decomposition (SVD):

SingularValueDecomposition s = new SingularValueDecomposition(matA);
DoubleMatrix2D U = s.getU();
DoubleMatrix2D S = s.getS();
DoubleMatrix2D V = s.getV();

Example of matrix multiplication:

Algebra alg = new Algebra();
DoubleMatrix2D result = alg.mult(matA,matB);

== See also ==
- List of open-source mathematical libraries
