= AppFuse =

Web application stack

- Developers: Matt Raible and several other developers
- Final release: 3.5.0 / February 19, 2015
- Written in: Java
- Operating system: Cross-platform
- Type: web application framework
- License: Apache License 2.0
- Website: appfuse.org
- Repository: AppFuse Repository

AppFuse was a full-stack framework for building web applications on the JVM. It was included in JBuilder.

In contrast to typical "new project" wizards, the AppFuse wizard generates multiple additional classes and files not only to implement various features but also to provide valuable examples for developers. This project comes pre-configured for database connectivity, appserver deployment, and user authentication, offering a ready-to-use framework for development.

When AppFuse was first developed, it only supported Struts and Hibernate. In version 2.x, it supports Hibernate, iBATIS or JPA as persistence frameworks. For implementing the MVC model, AppFuse is compatible with JSF, Spring MVC, Struts 2 or Tapestry.

Features integrated into AppFuse includes the following:

- Authentication and Authorization

== User Management ==
- Remember Me for the login screen
- Password Reminder
- Signup/Registration
- SSL Switching
- E-Mail
- URL rewriting
- Skinnability
- Page Decoration
- Templated Layout
- File Upload

The AppFuse project was shut down in April 2016 and its founder, Matt Raible, has gone and developed web applications and other Java products.

== Bibliography ==
- Whitehurst, David (August 16, 2008), The AppFuse Primer (First ed.), lulu.com, p. 214, ISBN 978-0-9748843-4-9
