= JProfiler =

JProfiler is a commercially licensed Java profiling tool developed by ej-technologies GmbH, targeted at Java EE and Java SE applications.

== Reviews ==
- Brown, Simon G. "JProfiler mini-review". Java.net.
- Hart-Davis, Damon. "A Note on the JProfiler Java Performance-tuning Tool: Review". Earth.org.uk.
