= Micronaut (framework) =

- Developer(s): Graeme Rocher
- Initial release: May 2018
- Stable release: 4.8.2 / 17 April 2025; 56 days ago
- Repository: Micronaut core repository, Micronaut platform repository
- Written in: Java, Groovy
- Operating system: Cross-platform
- Platform: Cross-platform (JVM)
- Type: Software framework
- License: Apache License 2.0
- Website: micronaut.io

Micronaut is an open source JVM-based framework for building lightweight microservices.

It is designed to avoid reflection, thus reducing memory consumption and improving start times. Features which would typically be implemented at run-time are instead pre-computed at compile time.

It was created by Graeme Rocher, who also created the Grails framework. In June 2020, Rocher co-founded the Micronaut Foundation, which aims to "advance innovation and adoption of Micronaut". Micronaut is continually developed and maintained by Object Computing Inc.
