= Multimap =

Data structure in computer science

In computer science, a multimap (sometimes also multihash, multidict or multidictionary) is a generalization of a map or associative array abstract data type in which more than one value may be associated with and returned for a given key. Both map and multimap are particular cases of containers. Often the multimap is implemented as a map with lists or sets as the map values.

== Examples ==
- In a student enrollment system, where students may be enrolled in multiple classes simultaneously, there might be an association for each enrollment of a student in a course, where the key is the student ID and the value is the course ID. If a student is enrolled in three courses, there will be three associations containing the same key.
- The index of a book may report any number of references for a given index term, and thus may be coded as a multimap from index terms to any number of reference locations or pages.
- Querystrings may have multiple values associated with a single field. This is commonly generated when a web form allows multiple check boxes or selections to be chosen in response to a single form element.

== Language support ==
=== C++ ===
The C++ standard library provides the std::multimap container for the sorted multimap using a self-balancing binary search tree..

As of C++11, the Standard Template Library provides the std::unordered_multimap for the unordered multimap implemented with a hash table, itself based on SGI's STL hash_multimap.

=== Dart ===
Quiver provides a Multimap for Dart.

=== Java ===
Apache Commons Collections provides a org.apache.commons.collections4.MultiMap interface for Java. It also provides a org.apache.commons.collections4.map.MultiValueMap implementing class that makes a org.apache.commons.collections4.MultiMap out of a java.util.Map object and a type of java.util.Collection.

Google Guava provides a com.google.common.collect.Multimap interface and implementations of it.

=== Kotlin ===
Kotlin does not have explicit support for multimaps, but can implement them using kotlin.collections.Maps with containers for the value type. E.g. a Map<User, List<Book>> can associate each User with a list of Books.

=== Python ===
Python provides a collections.defaultdict class that can be used to create a multimap. The user can instantiate the class as collections.defaultdict(list).

=== OCaml ===
OCaml's standard library module Hashtbl implements a hash table where it is possible to store multiple values for a key.

=== Scala ===
The Scala programming language's API also provides scala.collection.mutable.MultiMap and implementations.

== See also ==
- Multiset for the case where same item can appear several times
