= JGL (disambiguation) =

JGL may refer to:

- Joseph Gordon-Levitt, an American actor
- JGL Racing, the NASCAR team
- JGL (drug lord), a Mexican former drug lord
- ObjectSpace Generic Collection Library, a comprehensive set of reusable data structures and algorithms
