= Android App Bundle =

Android application publishing file format

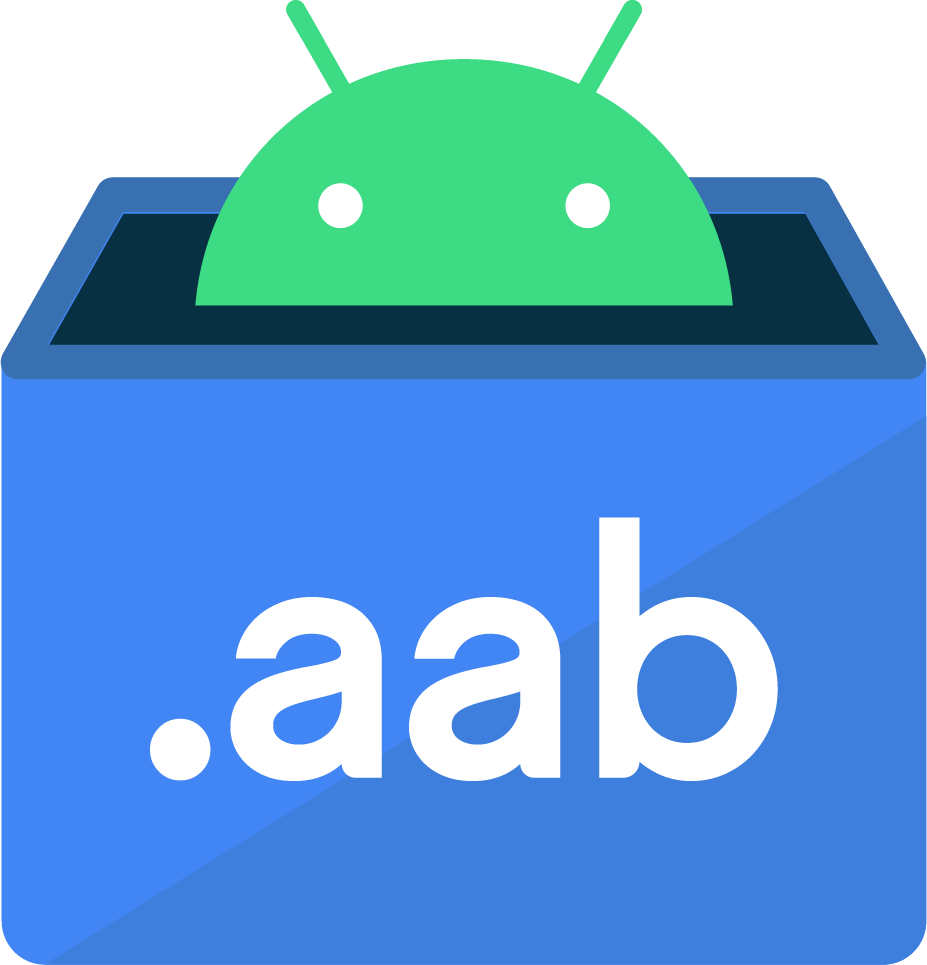
- Filename extension: .aab
- Type of format: Package format
- Container for: Android
- Open format?: yes
- Website: developer.android.com/guide/app-bundle

Android App Bundle (AAB) is a publishing format used by developers to distribute Android applications efficiently through the Google Play Store. This format enables the Play Store to generate APK files specifically tailored to each user's device. As a result, users download only the necessary components, reducing app size and improving installation speed.

This format must include the application's compiled code and resources, which allows for the signing and generation of APK files to be deferred to the app store, reducing the initial download size of the app. The file extension used for this format is ".aab".

Google Play requires Android App Bundles for all new apps since August 2021 and for all updates to preexisting apps since November 2021. Since May 2023, Android TV requires AABs.

== Split APKs ==
Without Android App Bundles, an APK can support multiple languages, up to four different CPU architectures, and several display resolutions. This meant that each installation file could contain potentially large amounts of bloat irrelevant for a device's specific combination of CPU, locale, and screen size.

Split APKs, which are generated by an app store like Google Play, contain only the code and resources that are needed for the specific device downloading the app. If the user changes their device language or feature set, the app store can then deliver additional split APKs on demand to meet the changed requirements.

Android App Bundles are required for using "play as you download" feature of Google Play, which lets users download and install a portion of the game to start playing and then download the rest while the user is occupied by the first level.

== See also ==
- Android software development
- apk (file format)
