= Apache Jelly =

Java and XML based scripting and processing engine

- Developer: Apache Software Foundation
- Written in: Java
- License: Apache License 2.0
- Website: apache.org/jelly

Apache Jelly is a Java and XML based scripting and processing engine for turning XML into executable code. Jelly is a component of Apache Commons.

Custom XML languages are commonly created to perform some kind of processing action. Jelly is intended to provide a simple XML based processing engine that can be extended to support various custom actions.

== Usage ==
CA Project and Portfolio Management, or CA PPM, formerly known as CA Clarity PPM or just Clarity, is a product of Broadcom. CA PPM uses an extended version of the Jelly tag-language as an automation and integration scripting language in its Process Management engine. CA PPM implementation of Jelly is called GEL (Generic Execution Language) and encompasses a new custom tag library that allows easier connection to CA PPM via its XML Open Gateway (XOG). The following example shows how CA PPM implements the classical "Hello World" application.

<gel:script xmlns:j="jelly:core" xmlns:gel="jelly:com.niku.union.gel.GELTagLibrary">
  <j:forEach indexVar="i" begin="1" end="3">
    <gel:out>Hello World ${i}!</gel:out>
  </j:forEach>
</gel:script>

Jelly is also used by the ServiceNow platform, which uses Jelly tag-language for scripting the UI, and by the Jenkins continuous integration server, which uses Jelly to allow plugins to extend its UI.
