= Commons Daemon =

Java software library

- Developer: Apache Software Foundation
- Stable release: 1.4.1 / January 13, 2025; 14 months ago
- Written in: Java, C
- Operating system: Cross-platform
- Type: Library
- License: Apache License 2.0
- Website: commons.apache.org/daemon
- Repository: github.com/apache/commons-daemon

Commons Daemon, formerly known as JSVC, is a Java software library belonging to the Apache Commons Project.

Daemon provides a portable means of starting and stopping a Java Virtual Machine (JVM) that is running server-side applications. Such applications often have additional requirements compared to client-side applications. For example, the servlet container Tomcat 4 would need to serialize sessions and shutdown web applications before the JVM process terminates.

Daemon comprises 2 parts: a native library written in C that interfaces with the operating system, and the library that provides the Daemon API, written in Java.

There are two ways to use Commons Daemon: by implementing the daemon interface or by calling a class that provides the required methods for daemon. For example, Tomcat-4.1.x uses the daemon interface and Tomcat-5.0.x provides a class whose methods are called by JSVC directly.

== See also ==
- Daemon (computing)
