= Java collections framework =

Collections in Java

Java collections framework class and interface hierarchy, excluding types in the java.util.concurrent package and a few other classes

The Java collections framework is a set of classes and interfaces that implement commonly reusable collection data structures (collections).

Although referred to as a framework, it works in a manner of a library. The collections framework provides both interfaces that define various collections and classes that implement them.

== Differences from Arrays ==
Collections and arrays are similar in that they both hold references to objects and they can be managed as a group. However, unlike arrays, Collections do not need to be assigned a certain capacity when instantiated. Collections can grow and shrink in size automatically when objects are added or removed.

Collections cannot hold primitive data types such as int, long, or double. Instead, Collections can hold wrapper classes such as java.lang.Integer, java.lang.Long, or java.lang.Double.

Collections are generic and hence invariant, but arrays are covariant. This can be considered an advantage of generic objects such as Collection when compared to arrays, because under circumstances, using the generic Collection instead of an array prevents run time exceptions by instead throwing a compile-time exception to inform the developer to fix the code. For example, if a developer declares an Object[] object, and assigns the Object[] object to the value returned by a new Long[] instance with a certain capacity, no compile-time exception will be thrown. If the developer attempts to add a String to this Long[] object, the java program will throw an ArrayStoreException. On the other hand, if the developer instead declared a new instance of a Collection<Object> as ArrayList<Long>, the Java compiler will (correctly) throw a compile-time exception to indicate that the code is written with incompatible and incorrect type, thus preventing any potential run-time exceptions.The developer can fix the code by instantianting Collection<Object> as an ArrayList<Object> object. If the code is using Java SE7 or later versions, the developer can instantiate Collection<Object> as an ArrayList<> object by using the diamond operator

Collections are generic and hence reified, but arrays are not reified.

== History ==
Collection implementations in pre-JDK 1.2 versions of the Java platform included few data structure classes, but did not contain a collections framework. The standard methods for grouping Java objects were via the array, the Vector, and the Hashtable classes, which unfortunately were not easy to extend, and did not implement a standard member interface.

To address the need for reusable collection data structures, several independent frameworks were developed, the most used being Doug Lea's Collections package, and ObjectSpace Generic Collection Library (JGL), whose main goal was consistency with the C++ Standard Template Library (STL).

The collections framework was designed and developed primarily by Joshua Bloch, and was introduced in JDK 1.2. It reused many ideas and classes from Doug Lea's Collections package, which was deprecated as a result. Sun Microsystems chose not to use the ideas of JGL, because they wanted a compact framework, and consistency with C++ was not one of their goals.

Doug Lea later developed a concurrency package, comprising new Collection-related classes. An updated version of these concurrency utilities was included in JDK 5.0 as of JSR 166.

== Architecture ==
Most collections in Java that are not maps are derived from the java.util.Collection interface. Collection defines the basic parts of all collections.

The interface has the add(E e) and remove(E e) methods for adding to and removing from a Collection respectively. It also has the toArray() method, which converts the Collection into an array of Objects in the Collection (with return type of Object[]). Finally, the contains(E e) method checks if a specified element exists in the Collection.

The Collection interface is a subinterface of java.lang.Iterable, so any Collection may be the target of a for-each statement. (The Iterable interface provides the iterator() method used by for-each statements.) All Collections implement java.util.Iterator to scan all of the elements in the Collection.

Collection is generic. Any Collection can store any Object. For example, any implementation of Collection<String> contains String objects. No casting is required when using the String objects from an implementation of Collection<String>. Note that the angled brackets < > can hold a type argument that specifies which type the Collection holds.

Collection Framework

Collection Framework just holds all the collections (general concept) like list etc, which follows collection interface.

Types of collection

There are several kinds of collections: queues, maps, lists and sets.

Queues allow the programmer to insert items in a certain order and retrieve those items in the same order. An example is a waiting list. The base interfaces for queues are called Queue.

Dictionaries/Maps store references to objects with a lookup key to access the object's values. One example of a key is an identification card. The base interface for dictionaries/maps is called Map.

Lists are finite collections where it can store the same value multiple times.

Sets are unordered collections that can be iterated and contain each element at most once. The base interface for sets is called Set.

== List interface ==
Lists are implemented in the collections framework via the java.util.Listinterface. It defines a list as essentially a more flexible version of an array. Elements have a specific order, and duplicate elements are allowed. Elements can be placed in a specific position. They can also be searched for within the list.

=== List implementations ===
There are several concrete classes that implement List, including AbstractList and all of its corresponding subclasses, as well as CopyOnWriteArrayList.

==== AbstractList class ====
The direct subclasses of AbstractList class include AbstractSequentialList, ArrayList and Vector.

AbstractList is an example of a skeletal implementation, which leverages and combines the advantages of interfaces and abstract classes by making it easy for the developer to develop their own implementation for the given interface.

===== ArrayList class =====
The java.util.ArrayList class implements the List as an array. Whenever functions specific to a List are required, the class moves the elements around within the array in order to do it.

===== LinkedList class =====
The java.util.LinkedList class stores the elements in nodes that each have a pointer to the previous and next nodes in the List. The List can be traversed by following the pointers, and elements can be added or removed simply by changing the pointers around to place the node in its proper place.

===== Vector class =====
The Vector class has Stack as its direct subclass. This is an example of a violation of the composition over inheritance principle in the Java platform libraries, since in computer science, a vector is generally not a stack. Composition would have been more appropriate in this scenario.

====== Stack class ======
The Stack class extends class java.util.Vector with five operations that allow a Vector to be treated as a Stack. Stacks are created using java.util.Stack. The Stack offers methods to put a new object on the Stack (method push(E e)) and to get objects from the Stack (method pop()). A Stack returns the object according to last-in-first-out (LIFO), e.g. the object which was placed latest on the Stack is returned first. java.util.Stack is a standard implementation of a stack provided by Java.

The Stack class represents a last-in-first-out (LIFO) stack of objects. The Stack class has five additional operations that allow a Vector to be treated as a Stack. The usual push(E e) and pop() operations are provided, as well as a method (peek()) to peek at the top item on the Stack, a method to test for whether the Stack is empty (empty()), and a method to search the Stack for an item and discover how far it is from the top (search(Object o)). When a Stack is first created, it contains no items.

==== CopyOnWriteArrayList class ====
The CopyOnWriteArrayList extends the Object class, and does not extend any other classes. CopyOnWriteArrayList allows for thread-safety without performing excessive synchronization.

In some scenarios, synchronization is mandatory. For example, if a method modifies a static field, and the method must be called by multiple threads, then synchronization is mandatory and concurrency utilities such as CopyOnWriteArrayList should not be used.

However synchronization can incur a performance overhead. For scenarios where synchronization is not mandatory, then the CopyOnWriteArrayList is a viable, thread-safe alternative to synchronization that leverages multi-core processors and results in higher CPU utilization.

== Queue interfaces ==
The java.util.Queue interface defines the queue data structure, which stores elements in the order in which they are inserted. New additions go to the end of the line, and elements are removed from the front. It creates a first-in first-out system. This interface is implemented by java.util.LinkedList, java.util.ArrayDeque, and java.util.PriorityQueue.

=== Queue implementations ===
==== AbstractQueue class ====
The direct subclasses of AbstractQueue class include ArrayBlockingQueue, ConcurrentLinkedQueue, DelayeQueue, LinkedBlockingDeque, LinkedBlockingQueue. LinkedTransferQueue and PriorityBlockingQueue.

Note that ArrayDeque and ConcurrentLinkedDeque both extend AbstractCollection but do not extend any other abstract classes such as AbstractQueue.

AbstractQueue is an example of a skeletal implementation.

===== PriorityQueue class =====
The java.util.PriorityQueue class implements java.util.Queue, but also alters it. PriorityQueue has an additional comparator() method. Instead of elements being ordered in the order in which they are inserted, they are ordered by priority. The method used to determine priority is either the java.lang.Comparable#compareTo(T) method in the elements, or a method given in the constructor. The class creates this by using a heap to keep the items sorted.

===== ConcurrentLinkedQueue class =====
The java.util.concurrent.ConcurrentLinkedQueue class extends java.util.AbstractQueue. ConcurrentLinkedQueue implements the java.util.Queue interface.

The ConcurrentLinkedQueue class is a thread-safe collection, since for any an element placed inside a ConcurrentLinkedQueue, the Java Collection Library guarantees that the element is safely published by allowing any thread to get the element from the collection. An object is said to be safely published if the object's state is made visible to all other thread at the same point in time. Safe publication usually requires synchronization of the publishing and consuming threads.

=== BlockingQueue interface ===
The java.util.concurrent.BlockingQueue interface extends Queue.

The BlockingQueue interface has the following direct sub-interfaces: BlockingDeque and TransferQueue. BlockingQueue works like a regular Queue, but additions to and removals from the BlockingQueue are blocking. If remove(Object o) is called on an empty BlockingQueue, it can be set to wait either a specified time or indefinitely for an item to appear in the BlockingQueue. Similarly, adding an item using the method add(Object o) is subject to an optional capacity restriction on the BlockingQueue, and the method can wait for space to become available in the BlockingQueue before returning. BlockingQueue interface introduces a method take() which removes and gets the head of the BlockingQueue, and waits until the BlockingQueue is no longer empty if required.

=== Double-ended queue (Deque) interfaces ===
The Deque interface extends the Queue interface. Deque creates a double-ended queue. While a regular Queue only allows insertions at the rear and removals at the front, the Deque allows insertions or removals to take place both at the front and the back. A Deque is like a Queue that can be used forwards or backwards, or both at once. Additionally, both a forwards and a backwards iterator can be generated. The Deque interface is implemented by java.util.ArrayDeque and java.util.LinkedList.

==== Deque implementations ====
===== LinkedList class =====
LinkedList, of course, also implements the List interface and can also be used as one. But it also has the Queue methods. LinkedList implements the java.util.Deque interface, giving it more flexibility.

===== ArrayDeque class =====
ArrayDeque implements the Queue as an array. Similar to LinkedList, ArrayDeque also implements the java.util.Deque interface.

==== BlockingDeque interface ====
The java.util.concurrent.BlockingDeque interface extends java.util.concurrent.BlockingQueue. BlockingDeque is similar to BlockingQueue. It provides the same methods for insertion and removal with time limits for waiting for the insertion or removal to become possible. However, the interface also provides the flexibility of a Deque. Insertions and removals can take place at both ends. The blocking function is combined with the Deque function.

== Set interfaces ==
Java's java.util.Setinterface defines the Set. A Set can't have any duplicate elements in it. Additionally, the Set has no set order. As such, elements can't be found by index. Set is implemented by java.util.HashSet, java.util.LinkedHashSet, and java.util.TreeSet.

=== Set interface implementations ===
There are several implementations of the Set interface, including AbstractSet and its subclasses, and the final static inner class ConcurrentHashMap.KeySetView<K, V> (where K and V are formal type parameters).

==== AbstractSet ====
AbstractSet is a skeletal implementation for the Set interface.

Direct subclasses of AbstractSet include ConcurrentSkipListSet, CopyOnWriteArraySet, EnumSet, HashSet and TreeSet.

===== EnumSet class =====
The EnumSet class extends AbstractSet. The EnumSet class has no public constructors, and only contain static factory methods.

EnumSet contains the static factory method EnumSet.of(). This method is an aggregation method. It takes in several parameters, takes into account of the type of the parameters, then returns an instance with the appropriate type.

EnumSet is a good replacement for the bit fields, which is a type of set, as described below.

Traditionally, whenever developers encountered elements of an enumerated type that needs to be placed in a set, the developer would use the int enum pattern in which every constant is assigned a different power of 2. This bit representation enables the developer to use the bitwise OR operation, so that the constants can be combined into a set, also known as a bit field. This bit field representation enables the developer to make efficient set-based operations and bitwise arithmetic such as intersection and unions.

However, there are many problems with bit field representation approach. A bit field is less readable than an int enum constant. Also, if the elements are represented by bit fields, it is not easy to iterate through all of these elements.

A recommended alternative approach is to use an EnumSet, where an int enum is used instead of a bit field. This approach uses an EnumSet to represent the set of values that belong to the same Enum type. Since the EnumSet implements the Set interface and no longer requires the use of bit-wise operations, this approach is more type-safe. Furthermore, there are many static factories that allow for object instantiation, such as the method EnumSet.of() method.

After the introduction of the EnumSet, the bit field representation approach is considered to be obsolete.

===== HashSet class =====
HashSet uses a hash table. More specifically, it uses a java.util.LinkedHashMap to store the hashes and elements and to prevent duplicates.

====== LinkedHashSet class ======
The java.util.LinkedHashSet class extends HashSet by creating a doubly linked list that links all of the elements by their insertion order. This ensures that the iteration order over the Set is predictable.

===== CopyOnWriteArraySet class =====
CopyOnWriteArraySet is a concurrent replacement for a synchronized Set. It provides improved concurrency in many situations by removing the need to perform synchronization or making a copy of the object during iteration, similar to how CopyOnWriteArrayList acts as the concurrent replacement for a synchronized List. On the other hand, similar to CopyOnWriteArrayList, CopyOnWriteArraySet should not be used when synchronization is mandatory.

=== SortedSet interface ===
The java.util.SortedSet interface extends the java.util.Set interface. Unlike a regular Set, the elements in a SortedSet are sorted, either by the element's compareTo(T o) method, or a method provided to the constructor of the SortedSet. The first and last elements of the SortedSet can be retrieved using the first() and last() methods respectively, and subsets can be created via minimum and maximum values, as well as beginning or ending at the beginning or ending of the SortedSet. The java.util.TreeSet class implements the SortedSet interface.

==== NavigableSet interface ====
The java.util.NavigableSet interface extends the java.util.SortedSet interface and has a few additional methods. The floor(E e), ceiling(E e), lower(E e), and higher(E e) methods find an element in the set that's close to the parameter. Additionally, a descending iterator over the items in the Set is provided. As with SortedSet, java.util.TreeSet implements NavigableSet.

===== TreeSet class =====
java.util.TreeSet uses a red–black tree implemented by a java.util.TreeMap. The red–black tree ensures that there are no duplicates. Additionally, it allows TreeSet to implement java.util.SortedSet.

===== ConcurrentSkipListSet class =====
ConcurrentSkipListSet acts as a concurrent replacement for implementations of a synchronized SortedSet. For example it replaces a TreeSet that has been wrapped by the synchronizedMap method.

== Map interfaces ==
Maps are defined by the java.util.Map interface in Java.

=== Map interface implementations ===
Map s are data structures that associate a key with an element. This lets the map be very flexible. If the key is the hash code of the element, the Map is essentially a Set. If it's just an increasing number, it becomes a list.

Examples of Map implementations include java.util.HashMap, java.util.LinkedHashMap, and java.util.TreeMap.

==== AbstractMap class ====
AbstractMap is an example of a skeletal implementation.

The direct subclasses of AbstractMap class include ConcurrentSkipListMap, EnumMap, HashMap, IdentityHashMap, TreeMap and WeakHashMap.

===== EnumMap =====
EnumMap extends AbstractMap. EnumMap has comparable speed with an ordinal-indexed array. This is because EnumMap internally uses an array, with implementation details completely hidden from the developer. Hence, the EnumMap gets the type safety of a Map while the performance advantages of an array.

===== HashMap =====
HashMap uses a hash table. The hashes of the keys are used to find the elements in various buckets. The HashMap is a hash-based collection.

====== LinkedHashMap ======
LinkedHashMap extends HashMap by creating a doubly linked list between the elements, allowing them to be accessed in the order in which they were inserted into the map. LinkedHashMap contains a protected removeEldestEntry method which is called by the put method whenever a new key is added to the Map. The Map removes its eldest entry whenever removeEldestEntry returns true. The removeEldestEntry method can be overridden.

===== TreeMap =====
TreeMap, in contrast to HashMap and LinkedHashMap, uses a red–black tree. The keys are used as the values for the nodes in the tree, and the nodes point to the elements in the Map.

===== ConcurrentHashMap =====
ConcurrentHashMap is similar to HashMap and is also a hash-based collection. However, there are a number of differences, such as the differences in the locking strategy they use.

The ConcurrentHashMap uses a completely different locking strategy to provide improved scalability and concurrency. ConcurrentHashMap does not synchronize every method using the same lock. Instead, ConcurrentHashMap use a mechanism known as lock striping. This mechanism provides a finer-grained locking mechanism. It also permits a higher degree of shared access.

===== ConcurrentSkipListMap class =====
ConcurrentSkipListMap acts as a concurrent replacement for implementations of a synchronized SortedMap. ConcurrentSkipListMap is very similar to ConcurrentSkipListSet, since ConcurrentSkipListMap replaces a TreeMap that has been wrapped by the synchronizedMap method.

=== Map subinterfaces ===
==== SortedMap interface ====
The java.util.SortedMap interface extends the java.util.Map interface. This interface defines a Map that's sorted by the keys provided. Using, once again, the compareTo() method or a method provided in the constructor to the SortedMap, the key-element pairs are sorted by the keys. The first and last keys in the Map can be called by using the firstKey() and lastKey() methods respectively. Additionally, submaps can be created from minimum and maximum keys by using the K) subMap(K fromKey, K toKey) method. SortedMap is implemented by java.util.TreeMap.

===== NavigableMap interface =====
The java.util.NavigableMap interface extends java.util.SortedMap in various ways. Methods can be called that find the key or map entry that's closest to the given key in either direction. The map can also be reversed, and an iterator in reverse order can be generated from it. It's implemented by java.util.TreeMap.

==== ConcurrentMap interface ====
The java.util.concurrent.ConcurrentMap interface extends the java.util.Map interface. This interface a thread Safe Map interface, introduced as of Java programming language's Java Collections Framework version 1.5.

== Extensions to the Java collections framework ==
Java collections framework is extended by the Apache Commons Collections library, which adds collection types such as a bag and bidirectional map, as well as utilities for creating unions and intersections.

Google has released its own collections libraries as part of the guava libraries.

== See also ==
- Collection
- Container
- Standard Template Library
- Java concurrency
- Java ConcurrentMap
