= Apache Commons =

Software libraries

Apache Commons logo

The Apache Commons is a project of the Apache Software Foundation, formerly under the Jakarta Project. The purpose of the Commons is to provide reusable, open source Java software. The Commons is composed of three parts: proper, sandbox, and dormant.

== Commons Proper ==
The Commons Proper is dedicated to creating and maintaining reusable Java components. The Commons Proper is a place for collaboration and sharing, where developers from throughout the Apache community can work together on projects to be shared by Apache projects and Apache users. Commons developers will make an effort to ensure that their components have minimal dependencies on other software libraries, so that these components can be deployed easily. In addition, Commons components will keep their interfaces as stable as possible, so that Apache users, as well as other Apache projects, can implement these components without having to worry about changes in the future.

Components	Description	Latest version	Released
BCEL	Byte Code Engineering Library - analyze, create, and manipulate Java class files	6.14.0	2026-11-12
BeanUtils	Easy-to-use wrappers around the Java reflection and introspection APIs	1.11.0	2025-05-25
BSF	Bean Scripting Framework - interface to scripting languages, including JSR-223	3.1	2011-08-17
Chain	Chain of Responsibility pattern implementation	1.2	2008-06-01
CLI	Command Line arguments parser	1.11.0	2025-11-08
Codec	General encoding/decoding algorithms (for example phonetic, base64, URL)	1.23.0	2026-10-04
Collections	Extends or augments the Java Collections Framework	4.6.0	2026-08-06
Compress	Defines an API for working with TAR, ZIP and BZIP2 files	1.28.0	2025-07-26
Configuration	Reading of configuration/preferences files in various formats	2.15.1	2026-05-21
Crypto	Cryptographic library optimized with AES-NI wrapping OpenSSL or JCE algorithm implementations	1.2.0	2023-01-14
CSV	Component for reading and writing comma separated value files	1.14.0	2025-03-15
Daemon	Generic Daemon (unix) or Service (Windows) wrapper for Java code	1.6.1	2026-06-03
DBCP	Database connection pooling services	2.14.0	2025-12-11
DbUtils	JDBC helper library	1.8.1	2023-09-09
Digester	XML-to-Java-object mapping utility	3.2	2011-12-13
Email	Library for sending e-mails	1.5	2017-08-01
Exec	API for dealing with external process execution and environment management	1.6.0	2025-11-25
FileUpload	File upload capability for servlets and web applications	1.6.0	2025-06-05
Functor	Supports functional programming using functors, objects representing functions	1.0 RC1	2011-10-20
Geometry	General-purpose library for geometric processing	1.0	2021-08-21
Imaging	Pure-Java image library	1.0-alpha6	2025-04-27
IO	Collection of I/O utilities	2.22.0	2026-04-19
JCI	Java Compiler Interface	1.1	2013-10-14
JCS	Java Caching System	3.2.1	2024-05-27
Jelly	XML based scripting and processing engine	1.0.1	2017-09-25
JEXL	Expression language which extends the Expression Language of the JSTL	3.7.1	2026-10-15
JXPath	Utilities for manipulating Java Beans using the XPath syntax	1.4.0	2025-04-12
Lang	Provides extra functionality for classes in java.lang	3.21.0	2026-09-25
Logging	Wrapper around a variety of logging API implementations	1.4.0	2026-06-11
Math	Lightweight, self-contained mathematics and statistics components	4.0-beta1	2022-12-20
Net	Collection of network utilities and protocol implementations	3.13.0	2026-03-15
Numbers	Number types (complex, quaternion, fraction) and utilities (arrays, combinatorics)	1.3	2026-04-20
Pool	Generic object pooling component	2.13.1	2025-12-30
Proxy	Library for creating dynamic proxies	2.0-RC1	2014-04-07
RDF	Common implementation of RDF 1.1 that could be implemented by systems on the JVM	0.5.0	2017-12-08
RNG	Implementions of pseudo-random numbers generators	1.6	2024-07-15
SCXML	Implementation of the State Chart XML specification aimed at creating and maintaining a Java SCXML engine	2.0-M1	2014-04-03
Statistics	Utilities for statistical applications	1.3	2026-05-01
Text	Library focused on algorithms working on strings	1.15.0	2025-12-04
Validator	Framework to define validators and validation rules in an XML file	1.11.0	2026-07-28
VFS	Virtual File System component for treating files, FTP, SMB, ZIP and such like as a single logical file system	2.10.0	2025-02-01
Weaver	Provides an easy way to enhance (weave) compiled bytecode	2.0	2018-09-07

== Commons Sandbox ==
The Commons Sandbox provides a workspace where Commons contributors collaborate and experiment on projects not included in the Commons Proper. Commons members champion projects in the Sandbox for promotion to the Commons Proper, and groups of developers work to enhance Sandbox projects until they meet the standards for promotion.

Components	Description
BeanUtils2	Redesign of Commons BeanUtils
ClassScan	Find Class interfaces, methods, fields, and annotations without loading
CLI2	Redesign of Commons CLI
Convert	Aims to provide a single library dedicated to the task of converting an object of one type to another
Finder	Java library inspired by the UNIX find command
Flatfile	Java library for working with flat data structures
Graph	General purpose Graph APIs and algorithms
I18n	Adds the feature of localized message bundles that consist of one or many localized texts that belong together
Id	Component for generating identifiers
Inject	Implementation of JSR 330, a standards compliant dependency injection framework
Javaflow	Continuation implementation to capture the state of the application
JNet	Allows using dynamically registered URL stream handlers through the java.net API
Monitoring	Aims to provide a simple but extensible monitoring solution for Java applications
Nabla	Provides automatic differentiation classes that can generate derivative of any function implemented in the Java language
OpenPGP	Interface to signing and verifying data using OpenPGP
Performance	Small framework for microbenchmark clients, with implementations for Commons DBCP and Pool
Pipeline	Provides a set of pipeline utilities designed around work queues that run in parallel to sequentially process data objects

== Commons Dormant ==
The Commons Dormant is a collection of components that have been declared inactive due to little recent development activity. These components may be used, but must be built yourself. It is best to assume that these components will not be released in the near future.

Components	Description
Attributes	Runtime API to metadata attributes such as doclet tags
Betwixt	Services for mapping JavaBeans to XML documents and vice versa
Cache	Provides object caching services
Clazz	Focuses on introspection and class manipulation
Contract	Component for making features that come along with contract based programming available
Convert	Aims to provide a single library dedicated to the task of converting an object of one type to another
Discovery	Tools for locating resources by mapping service/reference names to resource names
EL	Interpreter for the Expression Language defined by the JSP 2.0 specification
Events	Provides additional classes for firing and handling events. It focuses on the Java Collections Framework, providing decorators to other collections that fire events.
Feedparser	RSS and Atom parser designed to support all major versions of RSS and Atom, as well as easy ad hoc extension and RSS 1.0 modules capability
JJar	Jakarta JAR Archive Repository
Latka	HTTP functional testing suite for automated QA, acceptance and regression testing
Launcher	Cross platform Java application launcher
Mapper	Thin abstraction layer around a project's chosen data mapping technology (a.k.a. DAO pattern)
Messenger	Easy to use and lightweight framework for working with JMS in the web tier
Modeler	Mechanisms to create Model MBeans compatible with JMX specification
OGNL	Object-Graph Navigation Language
Primitives	Smaller, faster and easier to work with types supporting Java primitive types
Resources	Provides a lightweight framework for defining and looking up internationalized message strings keyed by a java.util.Locale and a message key
Scaffold	Toolkit for building web applications
ThreadPool	Simple component for asynchronously dispatching work to another thread in a pool for simple multithreaded programming
Transaction	Implementations for multi-level locks, transactional collections and transactional file access
Workflow	Provides a framework for building workflow management systems
XMLIO	Simple and fast importer for XML configuration or import files

== See also ==
- Google Guava
