= Write once, run anywhere =

Slogan for the Java Platform

Write once, run anywhere (WORA), or sometimes write once, run everywhere (WORE), is a 1995 slogan from Sun Microsystems to describe the cross-platform software benefits of the Java programming language. It refers to how compiled bytecode from Java source code can run on any system with a compatible Java virtual machine (JVM). In reality, there can be subtle differences in how a program executes due to variability in JVM implementation and host operating system which led to the comical slogan: Write once, debug everywhere.

As Java has achieved popularity, the installation of a JVM on chips, devices, and software packages became an industry standard practice.

== See also ==
- Criticism of Java – Criticism of the Java programming language and Java software platform
- Cross-platform software § Challenges
- Free Pascal – Free compiler and IDE for Pascal and ObjectPascal
- Parrot virtual machine – Software to run programming languages
- Software portability – Ability of a program to run on different platforms with little alteration
- Squeak (programming language) – Object-oriented programming language
- Universal Windows Platform – Computing platform by Microsoft
- Write once, compile anywhere – Design goal for source code to be universally compilable
- Write once, run forever
