= Android Runtime =

Runtime environment used by Android

ART
- Developer: Google
- Written in: C++
- Operating system: Android
- Platform: ARM64 RISC-V x86
- Included with: Android
- Predecessor: Dalvik
- Type: Runtime environment
- License: Apache License 2.0
- Website: source.android.com/docs/core/runtime
- Repository: android.googlesource.com/platform/art/

Android Runtime (ART) is an application runtime environment used by the Android operating system. Replacing Dalvik, the process virtual machine originally used by Android, ART performs the translation of some of the application's bytecode into native instructions that are later executed by the device's runtime environment.

== Overview ==
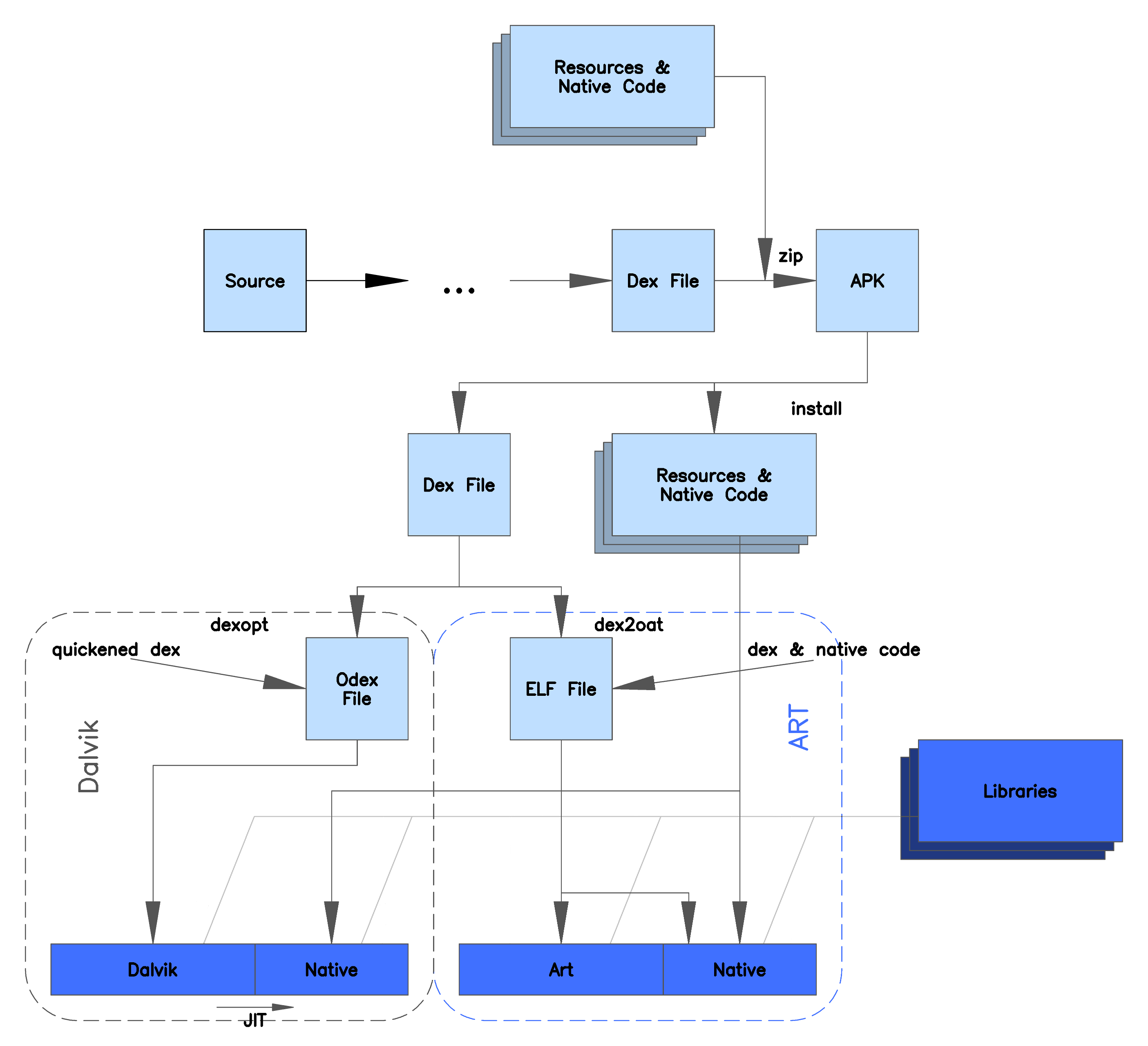
A comparison of Dalvik and ART architectures

Android 2.2 "Froyo" brought trace-based just-in-time (JIT) compilation into Dalvik, optimizing the execution of applications by continually profiling applications each time they run and dynamically compiling frequently executed short segments of their bytecode into native machine code. While Dalvik interprets the rest of an application's bytecode, native execution of those short bytecode segments, called "traces", provides significant performance improvements.

Unlike Dalvik, ART introduces the use of ahead-of-time (AOT) compilation by compiling the most performance-critical parts of applications (previously, the entire app) into native machine code upon their installation. This way, ART improves the overall execution efficiency and reduces power consumption, which results in improved battery autonomy on mobile devices. At the same time, ART brings faster execution of applications, improved memory allocation and garbage collection (GC) mechanisms, new applications debugging features, and more accurate high-level profiling of applications.

To maintain backward compatibility, ART uses the same input bytecode as Dalvik, supplied through standard .dex files as part of APK files, while the .odex files are replaced with Executable and Linkable Format (ELF) executables. Once an application is compiled by using ART's on-device dex2oat utility, it is run from the compiled ELF executable; as a result, ART eliminates various application execution overheads associated with Dalvik's interpretation and trace-based JIT compilation.

Initially, a disadvantage of ART was that additional time was required for compilation when an application was installed, and applications took up slightly more secondary storage (usually flash memory) to store the compiled code. Long AOT compilation became especially problematic when monthly security updates became the norm, locking users out of the OS for a long time after each update.

To improve on this, a hybrid approach was introduced in Android 7.0 (Nougat). Newly installed apps run using JIT compilation, and get profiled by the runtime. When the device is idle and charging, the runtime performs AOT compilation on the most frequently used ("hot") code.

== History ==
Android 4.4 "KitKat" introduced a technology preview of ART as an alternative runtime environment to Dalvik, which remained the default virtual machine. In the subsequent major Android release, Android 5.0 "Lollipop", Dalvik was entirely replaced by ART.

Android 7.0 "Nougat" turned the ART from a pure AOT to a hybrid JIT/AOT solution, while switching its Java Runtime Environment from the discontinued Apache Harmony to OpenJDK, introducing a JIT compiler with code profiling. The JIT compiler complements ART's AOT compiler, helping to improve runtime performance and save storage space by identifying "hot code" (code which is frequently used, runs on the UI thread or affects startup time), which the AOT compiler compiles to machine code while the device is idle and charging. Less-frequently used code relies on JIT compilation.

Android 9 "Pie" reduced the amount of storage used by APKs by using compressed bytecode files, and profiler data can be uploaded to Google Play servers to be bundled with apps when downloaded by users with a similar device, which shortens download time from Google Play by up to 40%. Google Play cloud profiles allow apps to be optimized on installation, which helps avoid the initial performance issues present on Android 7.0 to 8.1.

In July 2021, the concept of baseline profiles was introduced. Baseline profiles are ART profiles that define methods and classes which should undergo AOT compilation from an app's first launch, and are compatible with Android 7.0 and later. They provide similar functionality to Android 9's Google Play cloud profiles when they are not available and automatically merge with cloud profiles when they are available. Baseline profiles are included with releases of AndroidX libraries and Jetpack Compose.

ART was updated with a new garbage collector (GC) utilizing the Linux userfaultfd system call in Android 13. It reduces memory pressure, compiled code size and jank, and prevents the risk of killing apps because of low memory during garbage collection. Other changes also improve app startup, reduce jank and improve performance. Because of the Mainline project, Android 12's ART will also be updated.

== See also ==
- Android software development – various concepts and software development utilities used for the creation of Android applications
- Android version history – a history and descriptions of Android releases, listed primarily by their official API levels
- Comparison of application virtualization software – various portable and scripting language virtual machines
- Virtual machine – an emulation of a particular computer system, with different degrees of implemented functionality
