= Joshua Bloch =

American software engineer

Joshua J. Bloch
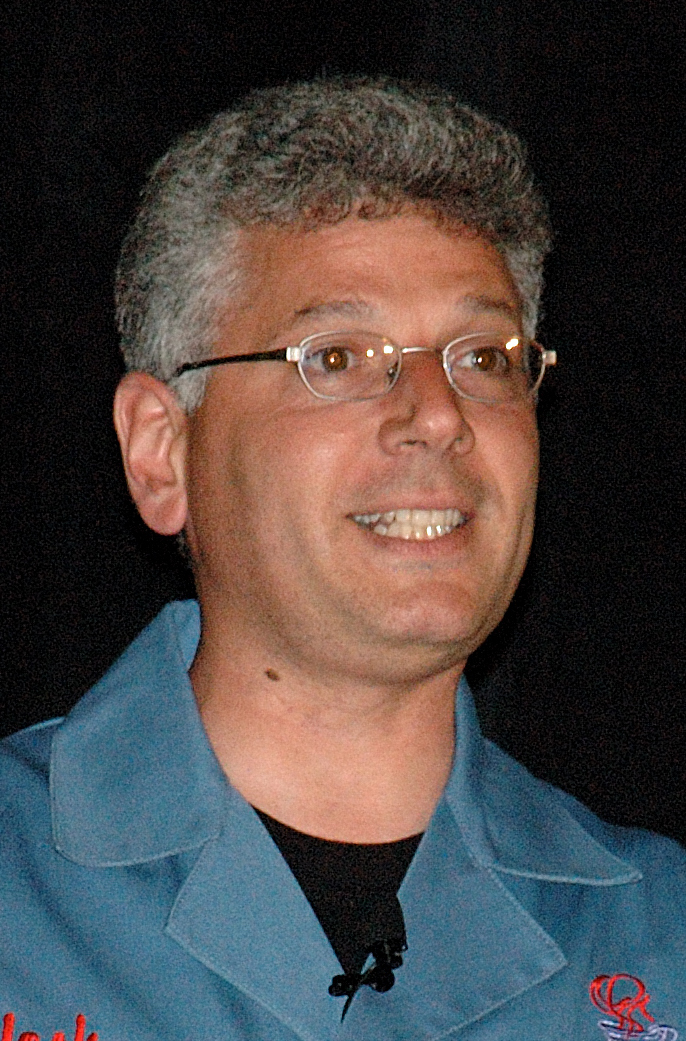
- Bloch at JavaOne in 2005
- Born: August 28, 1961 (age 65); Southampton, New York
- Education: Columbia University (B.S.); Carnegie Mellon University (Ph.D.)
- Scientific career
- Workplaces: Carnegie Mellon University
- Doctoral advisor: Alfred Spector

Joshua J. Bloch (born August 28, 1961) is an American software engineer and a technology author.

He led the design and implementation of numerous Java platform features, including the Java Collections Framework, the java.math package, and the assert mechanism. He is the author of the programming guide Effective Java (2001), which won the 2001 Jolt Award, and is a co-author of two other Java books, Java Puzzlers (2005) and Java Concurrency In Practice (2006).

Bloch holds a B.S. in computer science from Columbia University's School of Engineering and Applied Science and a Ph.D. in computer science from Carnegie Mellon University. His 1990 thesis was titled A Practical Approach to Replication of Abstract Data Objects and was nominated for the ACM Distinguished Doctoral Dissertation Award.

Bloch has worked as a Senior Systems Designer at Transarc, and later as a Distinguished Engineer at Sun Microsystems. In June 2004, he left Sun and became Chief Java Architect at Google. On August 3, 2012, Bloch announced that he would be leaving Google.

In December 2004, Java Developer's Journal included Bloch in its list of the "Top 40 Software People in the World".

Bloch has proposed the extension of the Java programming language with two features: Concise Instance Creation Expressions (CICE) (coproposed with Bob Lee and Doug Lea) and Automatic Resource Management (ARM) blocks. The combination of CICE and ARM formed one of the three early proposals for adding support for closures to Java. ARM blocks were added to the language in JDK7.

As of February 2025, Bloch is listed as Professor of practice of the Software and Societal Systems Department at Carnegie Mellon University.

== Bibliography ==
- Effective Java: Programming Language Guide, ISBN 0-201-31005-8, 2001; second edition: ISBN 978-0-321-35668-0, 2008; third edition: ISBN 978-0134685991, 2017
- Java Puzzlers: Traps, Pitfalls, and Corner Cases, ISBN 0-321-33678-X, 2005 (co-authored with Neal Gafter)
- Java Concurrency in Practice, ISBN 0-321-34960-1, 2006 (co-authored with Brian Goetz, Tim Peierls, Joseph Bowbeer, David Holmes, and Doug Lea)
- Joshua Bloch (2006). "How to design a good API and why it matters". Companion to the 21st ACM SIGPLAN conference on Object-oriented programming systems, languages, and applications - OOPSLA '06. doi:10.1145/1176617.1176622. Wikidata Q56602059.
