= Doug Lea =

American computer scientist

- Awards: 2010 Dahl-Nygaard Prize. Fellow of the Association for Computing Machinery
- Scientific career
- Fields: Computer Science
- Website: gee.cs.oswego.edu/dl/

Douglas S. Lea is a professor of computer science and (as of 2026) head of the computer science department at State University of New York at Oswego, where he specializes in concurrent programming and the design of concurrent data structures. He was on the Executive Committee of the Java Community Process and chaired JSR 166, which added concurrency utilities to the Java programming language (see Java concurrency). On October 22, 2010, Doug Lea notified the Java Community Process Executive Committee he would not stand for reelection. Lea was re-elected as an at-large member for the 2012 OpenJDK governing board.

== Publications ==
He wrote Concurrent Programming in Java: Design Principles and Patterns, one of the first books about the subject. In 2000, a second edition was released. He is also the author of dlmalloc, a widely used public-domain implementation of malloc.

== Awards ==
In 2010, he won the senior Dahl-Nygaard Prize.

In 2013, he became a Fellow of the Association for Computing Machinery.

== Bibliography ==
- Concurrent Programming in Java: Design Principles and Patterns, first edition: 1997; second edition: ISBN 0-201-31009-0, 1999
- Java Concurrency in Practice, ISBN 0-321-34960-1, 2006 (co-authored with Joshua Bloch, Brian Goetz, Tim Peierls, Joseph Bowbeer, and David Holmes)
