= Comparison of linear algebra libraries =

The following tables provide a comparison of linear algebra software libraries, either specialized or general purpose libraries with significant linear algebra coverage.

== Dense linear algebra ==
=== General information ===
	Creator	Language	First public release	Latest stable version	Source code availability	License	Notes
ALGLIB	ALGLIB Project	C++, C#, Python, FreePascal	2006	4.00.0 / 05.2023	Free	GPL/commercial	General purpose numerical analysis library with C++, C#, Python, FreePascal interfaces.
Armadillo	NICTA	C++	2009	12.6.6 / 10.2023	Free	Apache License 2.0	C++ template library for linear algebra; includes various decompositions and factorisations; syntax (API) is similar to MATLAB.
ATLAS	R. Clint Whaley et al.	C	2001	3.10.3 / 07.2016	Free	BSD	Automatically tuned implementation of BLAS. Also includes LU and Cholesky decompositions.
Blaze	K. Iglberger et al.	C++	2012	3.8 / 08.2020	Free	BSD	Blaze is an open-source, high-performance C++ math library for dense and sparse arithmetic.
Blitz++	Todd Veldhuizen	C++	?	1.0.2 / 10.2019	Free	GPL	Blitz++ is a C++ template class library that provides high-performance multidimensional array containers for scientific computing.
Boost uBLAS	J. Walter, M. Koch	C++	2000	1.84.0 / 12.2023	Free	Boost Software License	uBLAS is a C++ template class library that provides BLAS level 1, 2, 3 functionality for dense, packed and sparse matrices.
Dlib	Davis E. King	C++	2006	19.24.2 / 05.2023	Free	Boost	C++ template library; binds to optimized BLAS such as the Intel MKL; Includes matrix decompositions, non-linear solvers, and machine learning tooling
Eigen	Benoît Jacob	C++	2008	3.4.0 / 08.2021	Free	MPL2	Eigen is a C++ template library for linear algebra: matrices, vectors, numerical solvers, and related algorithms.
Fastor	R. Poya, A. J. Gil and R. Ortigosa	C++	2016	0.6.4 / 06.2023	Free	MIT License	Fastor is a high performance tensor (fixed multi-dimensional array) library for modern C++.
GNU Scientific Library	GNU Project	C, C++	1996	2.7.1 / 11.2021	Free	GPL	General purpose numerical analysis library. Includes some support for linear algebra.
IMSL Numerical Libraries	Rogue Wave Software	C, Java, C#, Fortran, Python	1970	many components	Non-free	Proprietary	General purpose numerical analysis library.
LAPACK		Fortran	1992	3.12.0 / 11.2023	Free	3-clause BSD	Numerical linear algebra library with long history
librsb	Michele Martone	C, Fortran, M4	2011	1.2.0 / 09.2016	Free	GPL	High-performance multi-threaded primitives for large sparse matrices. Support operations for iterative solvers: multiplication, triangular solve, scaling, matrix I/O, matrix rendering. Many variants: e.g.: symmetric, hermitian, complex, quadruple precision.
oneMKL	Intel	C, C++, Fortran	2003	2023.1 / 03.2023	Non-free	Intel Simplified Software License	Numerical analysis library optimized for Intel CPUs and GPUs. C++ SYCL based reference API implementation available in source for free.
Math.NET Numerics	C. Rüegg, M. Cuda, et al.	C#	2009	5.0.0 / 04.2022	Free	MIT License	C# numerical analysis library with linear algebra support
Matrix Template Library	Jeremy Siek, Peter Gottschling, Andrew Lumsdaine, et al.	C++	1998	4.0 / 2018	Free	Boost Software License	High-performance C++ linear algebra library based on Generic programming
NAG Numerical Library	The Numerical Algorithms Group	C, Fortran	1971	many components	Non-free	Proprietary	General purpose numerical analysis library.
NMath	CenterSpace Software	C#	2003	7.1 / 12.2019	Non-free	Proprietary	Math and statistical libraries for the .NET Framework
SciPy	Enthought	Python	2001	1.11.1 / 6.2023	Free	BSD	Based on Python
Xtensor	S. Corlay, W. Vollprecht, J. Mabille et al.	C++	2016	0.21.10 / 11.2020	Free	3-clause BSD	Xtensor is a C++ library meant for numerical analysis with multi-dimensional array expressions, broadcasting and lazy computing.

=== Matrix types and operations ===
Matrix types (special types like bidiagonal/tridiagonal are not listed):

- Real – general (nonsymmetric) real
- Complex – general (nonsymmetric) complex
- SPD – symmetric positive definite (real)
- HPD – Hermitian positive definite (complex)
- SY – symmetric (real)
- HE – Hermitian (complex)
- BND – band

Operations:

- TF – triangular factorizations (LU, Cholesky)
- OF – orthogonal factorizations (QR, QL, generalized factorizations)
- EVP – eigenvalue problems
- SVD – singular value decomposition
- GEVP – generalized EVP
- GSVD – generalized SVD

	Real	Complex	SPD	HPD	SY	HE	BND	TF	OF	EVP	SVD	GEVP	GSVD
ALGLIB	Yes	Yes	Yes	Yes	No	No	No	Yes	Yes	Yes	Yes	Yes	No
ATLAS	Yes	Yes	Yes	Yes	No	No	No	Yes	No	No	No	No	No
Dlib	Yes	Yes	Yes	Yes	Yes	Yes	No	Yes	Yes	Yes	Yes	No	No
GNU Scientific Library	Yes	Yes	Yes	Yes	No	No	No	Yes	Yes	Yes	Yes	Yes	Yes
ILNumerics.Net	Yes	Yes	Yes	Yes	No	No	No	Yes	Yes	Yes	Yes	No	No
IMSL Numerical Libraries	Yes	Yes	Yes	Yes	No	No	Yes	Yes	No	Yes	Yes	Yes	No
LAPACK	Yes	Yes	Yes	Yes	Yes	Yes	Yes	Yes	Yes	Yes	Yes	Yes	Yes
oneMKL	Yes	Yes	Yes	Yes	Yes	Yes	Yes	Yes	Yes	Yes	Yes	Yes	Yes
NAG Numerical Library	Yes	Yes	Yes	Yes	Yes	Yes	Yes	Yes	Yes	Yes	Yes	Yes	Yes
NMath	Yes	Yes	Yes	Yes	Yes	Yes	Yes	Yes	Yes	Yes	Yes	No	No
SciPy (Python packages)	Yes	Yes	Yes	Yes	No	No	No	Yes	Yes	Yes	Yes	No	No
Eigen	Yes	Yes	Yes	Yes	Yes	Yes	Yes	Yes	Yes	Yes	Yes	Yes	No
Armadillo	Yes	Yes	Yes	Yes	Yes	Yes	No	Yes	Yes	Yes	Yes	Yes	No
