= IT++ =

IT++ C++ Library
- Stable release: 4.3.1 / July 6, 2013; 12 years ago
- Written in: C++
- Operating system: Cross-platform
- Available in: English
- Type: Software library
- License: GPL open source
- Website: itpp.sourceforge.net

IT++ is a C++ library of classes and functions for linear algebra, numerical optimization, signal processing, communications, and statistics. It is being developed by researchers in these areas and is widely used by researchers, both in the communications industry and universities. The IT++ library originates from the former Department of Information Theory at the Chalmers University of Technology, Gothenburg, Sweden.

The kernel of the IT++ library is templated vector and matrix classes, and a set of accompanying functions. Such a kernel makes IT++ library similar to Matlab/Octave. For increased functionality, speed and accuracy, IT++ can make extensive use of existing free and open source libraries, especially BLAS, LAPACK and FFTW libraries. Instead of BLAS and LAPACK, some optimized platform-specific libraries can be used as well, i.e.:

- ATLAS (Automatically Tuned Linear Algebra Software) - includes optimised BLAS, CBLAS and a limited set of LAPACK routines;
- MKL (Intel Math Kernel Library) - includes all required BLAS, CBLAS, LAPACK and FFT routines (FFTW not required);
- ACML (AMD Core Math Library) - includes BLAS, LAPACK and FFT routines (FFTW not required).

It is possible to compile and use IT++ without any of the above-listed libraries, but the functionality will be reduced. IT++ works on Linux, Solaris, Windows (with Cygwin, MinGW/MSYS, or Microsoft Visual C++) and OS X operating systems.

== Example ==
Here is a trivial example demonstrating the IT++ functionality similar to Matlab/Octave,

import <itpp/itbase.h>;
import std;

using itpp::Mat;
using itpp::Vec;

int main() {
    Vec<double> a = itpp::linspace(0.0, 2.0, 2);
    Vec<double> b("1.0 2.0");
    Vec<double> c = 2 * a + 3 * b;
    std::println("c = {}", c);

    Mat<double> A("1.0 2.0; 3.0 4.0");
    Mat<double> B("0.0 1.0; 1.0 0.0");
    Mat<double> C = A * B + 2 * A;
    std::println("C = {}", C);
    std::println("inverse of B = {}", itpp::inv(B));

    return 0;
}

== See also ==
- List of numerical analysis software
- List of numerical libraries
- Numerical linear algebra
- Scientific computing
