= AMD Core Math Library =

AMD Core Math Library (ACML) is an end-of-life software development library released by AMD, replaced by many open source libraries, including AMD libm 4.0. This library provides mathematical routines optimized for AMD processors.

The successor to ACML is the AMD Optimizing CPU Libraries (AOCL), a set of mostly open source libraries compiled for AMD64 processors. It includes optimized open source forks of various projects including BLIS, libFLAME, ScaLAPACK, and FFTW. It also offers various new open source solutions including AOCL-Sparse which implements sparse linear algebra, the AOCL-LibM math library, and AOCL-LibMem which implements memcpy and similar functions. The AOCL RNG random number generation library is closed source.

== Features ==
ACML consists of the following main components:

- A full implementation of Level 1, 2 and 3 Basic Linear Algebra Subprograms (BLAS), with optimizations for AMD Opteron processors.
- A full suite of Linear Algebra (LAPACK) routines.
- A comprehensive suite of Fast Fourier transform (FFTs) in single-, double-, single-complex and double-complex data types.
- Fast scalar, vector, and array math transcendental library routines
- Random Number Generators in both single- and double-precision

== Supported platforms ==
AMD offers pre-compiled binaries for Linux, Solaris, and Windows available for download. Supported compilers include GNU Fortran, Intel Fortran Compiler, Microsoft Visual Studio, NAG, PathScale, PGI compiler, and Sun Studio.

== License ==
ACML has a proprietary freeware license. The library is distributed in binary form free of charge, but cannot be freely redistributed.

== See also ==
- GPUOpen – Open-source software suite for visual effects, HPC, and GPGPU
- Framewave – formerly the AMD Performance Library
- Open64 – AMD has an Open64 compiler distribution that can be used with ACML
- Math Kernel Library (MKL)
