= DnAnalytics =

dnAnalytics
- Final release: 2009.4 / April 29, 2009; 16 years ago
- Written in: C#, F#, .NET CLR
- Operating system: Cross-platform
- Type: Numerical library
- License: BSD/Microsoft Public License
- Website: dnanalytics.codeplex.com

dnAnalytics was an open-source numerical library for .NET written in C# and F#. It featured functionality similar to BLAS and LAPACK. It was merged into Math.NET Numerics in 2009.

== Features ==
The software library provides facilities for:

- Linear algebra classes with support for sparse matrices and vectors (with an F# friendly interface).
- Dense and sparse solvers.
- Probability distributions.
- Random number generation (including Mersenne Twister MT19937).
- QR, LU, SVD, and Cholesky decomposition classes.
- Matrix IO classes that read and write matrices from/to Matlab, Matrix Market, and delimited files.
- Complex and “special” math routines.
- Descriptive Statistics, Histogram, and Pearson Correlation Coefficient.
- Overload mathematical operators to simplify complex expressions.
- Visual Studio visual debuggers for matrices and vectors
- Runs under Microsoft Windows and platforms that support Mono.
- Optional support for Intel Math Kernel Library (Microsoft Windows and Linux)

== See also ==
- Math.NET Numerics
- List of numerical libraries
- list of numerical analysis software
