= BLIS (software) =

Numerical software library

- Original authors: Science of High-Performance Computing (SHPC) group, UT-Austin
- Developers: Field Van Zee and Devin Matthews
- Initial release: November 9, 2013; 12 years ago
- Stable release: 1.0 / May 6, 2024; 21 months ago
- Operating system: Linux; Microsoft Windows macOS; FreeBSD
- Platform: x86-64 ARM; ARM64...
- Type: Linear algebra library; implementation of BLAS
- License: new/modified/3-clause BSD License
- Website: www.github.com/flame/blis
- Repository: www.github.com/flame/blis

In scientific computing, BLIS (BLAS-like Library Instantiation Software) is an open-source framework for implementing a superset of BLAS (Basic Linear Algebra Subprograms) functionality for specific processor types that was awarded the J. H. Wilkinson Prize for Numerical Software in 2023. It exposes that functionality through two traditional Application Programming Interfaces (APIs): the BLAS interface and the CBLAS interface. BLIS also includes two APIs native to the framework: a typed (BLAS-like) API and an object API. These native interfaces provide access to BLAS-like functionality that is not supported by, but closely related to, operations found in the BLAS (and CBLAS). The framework is developed and supported by the Science of High-Performance Computing (SHPC) group of the Oden Institute for Computational Engineering and Sciences at The University of Texas at Austin and the Matthews Research Group at Southern Methodist University.

BLIS yields high performance on many current CPU microarchitectures in both single-threaded and multithreaded modes of execution. BLIS also offers competitive performance for some cases of matrix multiplication in which one or more matrix operands are unusually skinny and/or small.

The framework achieves high performance by employing specialized kernels (typically written in GNU extended inline assembly syntax) along with cache and register blocking through matrix operands. BLIS also works on processors for which custom kernels have not yet been written; in those cases, the framework relies upon portable kernel implementations that perform at a lower rate of computation.

BLIS is sometimes described as a refactoring of GotoBLAS2, which was created by Kazushige Goto at the Texas Advanced Computing Center.

== See also ==
- Automatically Tuned Linear Algebra Software (ATLAS)
- List of open-source mathematical libraries
- OpenBLAS
- Intel Math Kernel Library (MKL)
