= Armadillo (C++ library) =

Armadillo C++ Library
- Stable release: 15.4.2 / July 23, 2026; 1 month ago
- Written in: C++
- Operating system: Cross-platform
- Available in: English
- Type: Software library
- License: Apache 2.0 (open source)
- Website: arma.sourceforge.net

Armadillo is a linear algebra software library for the C++ programming language. It aims to provide efficient and streamlined base calculations, while at the same time having a straightforward and easy-to-use interface. Its intended target users are scientists and engineers.

It supports integer, floating point (single and double precision), complex numbers, and a subset of trigonometric and statistics functions. Dense and sparse matrices are supported. Various matrix decompositions are provided through optional integration with Linear Algebra PACKage (LAPACK), Automatically Tuned Linear Algebra Software (ATLAS), and ARPACK. High-performance BLAS/LAPACK replacement libraries such as OpenBLAS and Intel MKL can also be used.

The library employs a delayed-evaluation approach (during compile time) to combine several operations into one and reduce (or eliminate) the need for temporaries. Where applicable, the order of operations is optimised. Delayed evaluation and optimisation are achieved through template metaprogramming.

Armadillo is related to the Boost Basic Linear Algebra Subprograms (uBLAS) library, which also uses template metaprogramming. However, Armadillo builds upon ATLAS and LAPACK libraries, thereby providing machine-dependent optimisations and functions not present in uBLAS.

It is open-source software distributed under the permissive Apache License, making it applicable for the development of both open source and proprietary software. The project is supported by the NICTA research centre in Australia.

An interface to the Python language is available through the PyArmadillo package, which facilitates prototyping of algorithms in Python followed by relatively straightforward conversion to C++.

Armadillo is a core dependency of the mlpack machine learning library and the ensmallen C++ library for numerical optimization.

A GPU-based implementation of the Armadillo C++ API is provided by the Bandicoot GPU library.

== Example ==
Here is a trivial example demonstrating Armadillo functionality:

import <armadillo>;
import std;

using arma::Col;
using arma::Mat;

int main() {
    //    ^
    //    |
    //    | (0,1)
    //    +---x-->
    // Position of a particle
    Col<double> pos = {{0}, {1}};

    // Rotation matrix 
    double phi = - std::numbers::pi / 2; 
    Mat<double> m = {
        { std::cos(phi), -std::sin(phi) },
        { std:sin(phi), std::cos(phi) }
    };

    pos.print("Current position of the particle:");
    std::println("Rotating the point {} degrees", (phi * 180) / std::numbers::pi);

    pos *= m;

    pos.print("New position of the particle:");   
    //    ^
    //    x (1,0)
    //    | 
    //    +------>

    return 0;
}

A different example, in C++98, is:

#include <iostream>
#include <armadillo>

using std::cout;

using arma::Col;
using arma::Mat;
using arma::endr;

int main() {
    Col<double> b;
    b << 2.0 << 5.0 << 2.0;

    // arma::endr represents the end of a row in a matrix
    Mat<double> a;
    a << 1.0 << 2.0 << endr << 2.0 << 3.0 << endr << 1.0 << 3.0 << endr;

    cout << "Least squares solution:\n" << arma::solve(A, b) << '\n';

    return 0;
}

== See also ==
- mlpack
- List of numerical analysis software
- List of numerical libraries
- List of open-source mathematical libraries
- Numerical linear algebra
- Scientific computing
