= Marlis Hochbruck =

German mathematician (born 1964)

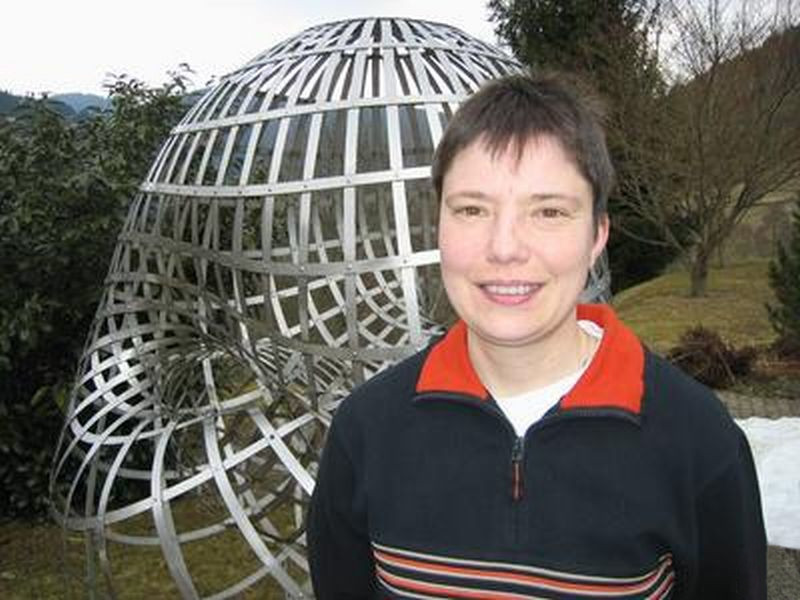
Hochbruck in Oberwolfach, 2006

Marlis Hochbruck (born 12 June 1964) is a German applied mathematician and numerical analyst known for her research on matrix exponentials, exponential integrators, and their applications to the numerical solution of differential equations. She is a professor in the Institute for Applied and Numerical Mathematics at the Karlsruhe Institute of Technology.

== Education and career ==
Hochbruck went to high school in Krefeld, and studied Technomathematics at the Karlsruhe Institute of Technology from 1983 to 1989. She completed her Ph.D. at Karlsruhe in 1992. Her dissertation, Lanczos und Krylov-Verfahren für nicht-Hermitesche lineare Systeme, was jointly supervised by Wilhelm Niethammer and Michael Eiermann.

After postdoctoral research at ETH Zurich, she became an assistant at the University of Würzburg in 1992, and moved to the University of Tübingen in 1994. She obtained her first professorship in 1998, in applied mathematics at the University of Düsseldorf, declining two offers of professorships at other German universities in the same year. In 2010 she returned to Karlsruhe as a professor.

As well as holding her professorship at Karlsruhe, she has been a vice president of the Deutsche Forschungsgemeinschaft since 2014.

== Selected publications ==
- Hochbruck, Marlis; Lubich, Christian (1997), "On Krylov subspace approximations to the matrix exponential operator", SIAM Journal on Numerical Analysis, 34 (5): 1911–1925, Bibcode:1997SJNA...34.1911H, doi:10.1137/S0036142995280572, MR 1472203
- Hochbruck, Marlis; Lubich, Christian; Selhofer, Hubert (1998), "Exponential integrators for large systems of differential equations", SIAM Journal on Scientific Computing, 19 (5): 1552–1574, Bibcode:1998SJSC...19.1552H, doi:10.1137/S1064827595295337, MR 1618808
- Hochbruck, Marlis; Ostermann, Alexander (2005), "Explicit exponential Runge–Kutta methods for semilinear parabolic problems", SIAM Journal on Numerical Analysis, 43 (3): 1069–1090, doi:10.1137/040611434, MR 2177796
- Hochbruck, Marlis; Ostermann, Alexander (2010), "Exponential integrators", Acta Numerica, 19: 209–286, Bibcode:2010AcNum..19..209H, doi:10.1017/S0962492910000048, MR 2652783
