= Eigen (C++ library) =

Open-source linear algebra library

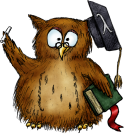
- Original authors: Benoît Jacob; Gaël Guennebaud
- Developers: Rasmus Munk Larsen; Charles Schlosser; Antonio Sanchez
- Stable release: 5.0.0 / 30 September 2025 (9 months ago)
- Written in: C++
- Operating system: Cross-platform
- Standard: C++14
- Type: Library
- License: MPL 2.0
- Website: gitlab.com/libeigen/eigen

Eigen is a high-level C++ library of template headers for linear algebra, matrix and vector operations, geometrical transformations, numerical solvers and related algorithms. Eigen is open-source software licensed under the Mozilla Public License 2.0 since version 3.1.1. Earlier versions were licensed under the GNU Lesser General Public License. Version 1.0 was released in Dec 2006.

Eigen is implemented using the expression templates metaprogramming technique, meaning it builds expression trees at compile time and generates custom code to evaluate these. Using expression templates and a cost model of floating point operations, the library performs its own loop unrolling and vectorization. Eigen itself can provide BLAS and a subset of LAPACK interfaces.

== See also ==
- List of numerical libraries
- List of open-source mathematical libraries
- Numerical linear algebra
