= PBLAS =

Parallel Basic Linear Algebra Subprograms (PBLAS) is an implementation of Level 2 and 3 BLAS intended for distributed memory architectures. It provides a computational backbone for ScaLAPACK, a parallel implementation of LAPACK. It depends on Level 1 sequential BLAS operations for local computation and BLACS for communication between nodes.
