= Packed storage matrix =

Programming term

A packed storage matrix, also known as packed matrix, is a term used in programming for representing an $m\times n$ matrix. It is a more compact way than an m-by-n rectangular array by exploiting a special structure of the matrix.

Typical examples of matrices that can take advantage of packed storage include:

- symmetric or hermitian matrix
- Triangular matrix
- Banded matrix.

== Triangular packed matrices ==
The packed storage matrix allows a matrix to be converted to an array, shrinking the matrix significantly. In doing so, a square $n \times n$ matrix is converted to an array of length (n(n+1))/2.

Consider the following upper matrix:

$$\mathbf{U} = \begin{pmatrix}
a_{11} & a_{12} & a_{13} & a_{14} \\
& a_{22} & a_{23} & a_{24} \\
&        & a_{33} & a_{34} \\
&        &        & a_{44} \\
\end{pmatrix}$$

which can be packed into the one array:

$\mathbf{UP} = (\underbrace{a_{11}}\ \underbrace{a_{12}\ a_{22}}\ \underbrace{a_{13}\ a_{23}\ a_{33}}\ \underbrace{a_{14},\ a_{24}\ a_{34}\ a_{44}})$

Similarly the lower matrix:

$$\mathbf{L} = \begin{pmatrix}
a_{11} &        &        &        \\
a_{21} & a_{22} &        &        \\
a_{31} & a_{32} & a_{33} &        \\
a_{41} & a_{42} & a_{43} & a_{44} \\
\end{pmatrix}.$$

can be packed into the following one dimensional array:

$LP = (\underbrace{a_{11}\ a_{21}\ a_{31}\ a_{41}}\ \underbrace{a_{22}\ a_{32}\ a_{42}}\ \underbrace{a_{33}\ a_{43}}\ \underbrace{a_{44}})$

== Code examples (Fortran) ==
Both of the following storage schemes are used extensively in BLAS and LAPACK.

An example of packed storage for Hermitian matrix:

complex :: A(n,n) ! a hermitian matrix
complex :: AP(n*(n+1)/2) ! packed storage for A
! the lower triangle of A is stored column-by-column in AP.
! unpacking the matrix AP to A
do j=1,n
  k = j*(j-1)/2
  A(1:j,j) = AP(1+k:j+k)
  A(j,1:j-1) = conjg(AP(1+k:j-1+k))
end do

An example of packed storage for banded matrix:

real :: A(m,n) ! a banded matrix with kl subdiagonals and ku superdiagonals
real :: AP(-kl:ku,n) ! packed storage for A
! the band of A is stored column-by-column in AP. Some elements of AP are unused.
! unpacking the matrix AP to A
do j = 1, n
  forall(i=max(1,j-kl):min(m,j+ku)) A(i,j) = AP(i-j,j)
end do
print *,AP(0,:) ! the diagonal

== See also ==
- Sparse matrix
- Skyline matrix
- band matrix
