= LAPACK =

Software library for numerical linear algebra

LAPACK (Netlib reference implementation)
- Release: 1992; 34 years ago
- Stable release: 3.12.1 / 8 January 2025; 18 months ago
- Written in: Fortran 90
- Type: Software library
- License: BSD-new
- Website: netlib.org/lapack/
- Repository: github.com/Reference-LAPACK/lapack

LAPACK ("Linear Algebra Package") is a standard software library for numerical linear algebra. It provides routines for solving systems of linear equations and linear least squares, eigenvalue problems, and singular value decomposition. It also includes routines to implement the associated matrix factorizations such as LU, QR, Cholesky and Schur decomposition. The routines handle both real and complex matrices in both single and double precision. LAPACK relies on an underlying BLAS implementation to provide efficient and portable computational building blocks for its routines.

LAPACK was originally written in FORTRAN 77, but moved to Fortran 90 in version 3.2 (2008). It is officially distributed through the Netlib repository. Maintenance work is nowadays done in a GitHub repository.

LAPACK was designed as the successor to the linear equations and linear least-squares routines of LINPACK and the eigenvalue routines of EISPACK. LINPACK, written in the 1970s and 1980s, was designed to run on the then-modern vector computers with shared memory. LAPACK, in contrast, was designed to effectively exploit the caches on modern cache-based architectures and the instruction-level parallelism of modern superscalar processors, and thus can run orders of magnitude faster than LINPACK on such machines, given a well-tuned BLAS implementation. LAPACK has also been extended to run on distributed memory systems in later packages such as ScaLAPACK and PLAPACK.

Netlib LAPACK is licensed under a three-clause BSD style license, a permissive free software license with few restrictions.

== Naming scheme ==
Subroutines in LAPACK have a naming convention which makes the identifiers very compact. This was necessary as the first Fortran standards only supported identifiers up to six characters long, so the names had to be shortened to fit into this limit.

A LAPACK subroutine name is in the form pmmaaa, where:

- p is a one-letter code denoting the type of numerical constants used. S, D stand for real floating-point arithmetic respectively in single and double precision, while C and Z stand for complex arithmetic with respectively single and double precision. The newer version, LAPACK95, uses generic subroutines in order to overcome the need to explicitly specify the data type.
- mm is a two-letter code denoting the kind of matrix expected by the algorithm. The codes for the different kind of matrices are reported below; the actual data are stored in a different format depending on the specific kind; e.g., when the code DI is given, the subroutine expects a vector of length n containing the elements on the diagonal, while when the code GE is given, the subroutine expects an n×n array containing the entries of the matrix.
- aaa is a one- to three-letter code describing the actual algorithm implemented in the subroutine, e.g. SV denotes a subroutine to solve linear system, while R denotes a rank-1 update.

For example, the subroutine to solve a linear system with a general (non-structured) matrix using real double-precision arithmetic is called DGESV.

Matrix types in the LAPACK naming scheme
Name	Description
BD	bidiagonal matrix
DI	diagonal matrix
GB	general band matrix
GE	general matrix (i.e., unsymmetric, in some cases rectangular)
GG	general matrices, generalized problem (i.e., a pair of general matrices)
GT	general tridiagonal matrix
HB	(complex) Hermitian band matrix
HE	(complex) Hermitian matrix
HG	upper Hessenberg matrix, generalized problem (i.e. a Hessenberg and a triangular matrix)
HP	(complex) Hermitian, packed storage matrix
HS	upper Hessenberg matrix
OP	(real) orthogonal matrix, packed storage matrix
OR	(real) orthogonal matrix
PB	symmetric matrix or Hermitian matrix positive definite band
PO	symmetric matrix or Hermitian matrix positive definite
PP	symmetric matrix or Hermitian matrix positive definite, packed storage matrix
PT	symmetric matrix or Hermitian matrix positive definite tridiagonal matrix
SB	(real) symmetric band matrix
SP	symmetric, packed storage matrix
ST	(real) symmetric matrix tridiagonal matrix
SY	symmetric matrix
TB	triangular band matrix
TG	triangular matrices, generalized problem (i.e., a pair of triangular matrices)
TP	triangular, packed storage matrix
TR	triangular matrix (or in some cases quasi-triangular)
TZ	trapezoidal matrix
UN	(complex) unitary matrix
UP	(complex) unitary, packed storage matrix

== Use with other programming languages and libraries ==
Many programming environments today support the use of libraries with C binding (LAPACKE, a standardised C interface, has been part of LAPACK since version 3.4.0), allowing LAPACK routines to be used directly so long as a few restrictions are observed. Additionally, many other software libraries and tools for scientific and numerical computing are built on top of LAPACK, such as R, MATLAB, and SciPy.

Several alternative language bindings are also available:

- Armadillo for C++
- IT++ for C++
- LAPACK++ for C++
- Lacaml for OCaml
- SciPy for Python
- Gonum for Go
- PDL::LinearAlgebra for Perl Data Language
- Math::Lapack for Perl
- NLapack for .NET
- CControl for C in embedded systems
- lapack for rust

== Implementations ==
As with BLAS, LAPACK is sometimes forked or rewritten to provide better performance on specific systems. Some of the implementations are:

Accelerate
Apple's framework for macOS and iOS, which includes tuned versions of BLAS and LAPACK.
Netlib LAPACK
The official LAPACK.
Netlib ScaLAPACK
Scalable (multicore) LAPACK, built on top of PBLAS.
Intel MKL
Intel's Math routines for their x86 CPUs.
OpenBLAS
Open-source reimplementation of BLAS and LAPACK.
Gonum LAPACK
A partial native Go implementation.

Since LAPACK typically calls underlying BLAS routines to perform the bulk of its computations, simply linking to a better-tuned BLAS implementation can be enough to significantly improve performance. As a result, LAPACK is not reimplemented as often as BLAS is.

=== Similar projects ===
These projects provide a similar functionality to LAPACK, but with a main interface differing from that of LAPACK:

Libflame
A dense linear algebra library. Has a LAPACK-compatible wrapper. Can be used with any BLAS, although BLIS is the preferred implementation.
Eigen
A header library for linear algebra. Has a BLAS and a partial LAPACK implementation for compatibility.
MAGMA
Matrix Algebra on GPU and Multicore Architectures (MAGMA) project develops a dense linear algebra library similar to LAPACK but for heterogeneous and hybrid architectures including multicore systems accelerated with GPGPUs.
PLASMA
The Parallel Linear Algebra for Scalable Multi-core Architectures (PLASMA) project is a modern replacement of LAPACK for multi-core architectures. PLASMA is a software framework for development of asynchronous operations and features out of order scheduling with a runtime scheduler called QUARK that may be used for any code that expresses its dependencies with a directed acyclic graph.

== See also ==
- List of numerical libraries
- List of open-source mathematical libraries
- Math Kernel Library (MKL)
- NAG Numerical Library
- SLATEC, a FORTRAN 77 library of mathematical and statistical routines
- QUADPACK, a FORTRAN 77 library for numerical integration
