= Kazushige Goto =

Kazushige Gotō (後藤和茂, Gotō Kazushige) is a software engineer specializing in high performance, hand-written, machine code.

== Education ==
Goto was a research associate at the Texas Advanced Computing Center at the University of Texas at Austin when he wrote his famously hand-optimized assembly routines for supercomputing and PC platforms that outperform the best compiler generated code.

== Career ==
In 2010, Goto joined Microsoft's Technical Computing Group with the title of Senior Researcher.

In July 2012, he joined Intel with the title of Software Engineer.

Goto continues to write hand-optimized machine code, utilizing detailed knowledge of the architecture to which he has access.
