= Math Kernel Library =

Optimized math routines developed by Intel

Intel oneAPI Math Kernel Library
- Developer: Intel
- Initial release: November 1994; 31 years ago
- Stable release: 2024.2 / June 14, 2024; 22 months ago
- Written in: C/C++, DPC++, Fortran
- Operating system: Microsoft Windows, Linux
- Platform: CPU: Intel Xeon; Intel Core; Intel Atom; GPU: Intel UHD Graphics for 11th generation Intel processors or newer; Intel Iris Xe graphics; Intel Arc graphics; Intel Data Center GPU Flex Series; Intel Data Center GPU Max Series
- Type: Library and framework
- License: freeware under ISSL
- Website: www.intel.com/content/www/us/en/developer/tools/oneapi/onemkl.html

Intel oneAPI Math Kernel Library (Intel oneMKL), formerly known as Intel Math Kernel Library, is a library of optimized math routines for science, engineering, and financial applications. Core math functions include BLAS, LAPACK, ScaLAPACK, sparse solvers, fast Fourier transforms, and vector math.

The library supports x86 CPUs and Intel GPUs and is available for Windows and Linux operating systems.

Intel oneAPI Math Kernel Library is not to be confused with the oneAPI Math Library (oneMath), formerly known as oneMKL Interfaces, which is an open-source wrapper library that allows DPC++ applications to call oneMKL routines that can be offloaded to multiple hardware architectures and vendors defined during runtime.

== History and licensing ==
Intel launched the oneAPI Math Kernel Library in November 1994, and called it Intel BLAS Library. In 1996, the library was renamed to Intel Math Kernel Library until April 2020, when intel oneMKL has become part of oneAPI initiative to support multiple hardware architectures, holding the current name Intel oneAPI Math Kernel Library.

The library is available as part of oneAPI Toolkits and in a standalone form, free of charge under the terms of Intel Simplified Software License which allow redistribution. Commercial support for Intel oneMKL is available when purchased as part of oneAPI Base Toolkit.

Following Apple’s transition away from x86 CPUs, Intel oneMKL last release available for macOS is the version 2023.2.2 and it is scheduled for removal by the end of 2024.

== Performance and vendor lock-in ==
MKL and other programs generated by the Intel C++ Compiler and the Intel DPC++ Compiler improve performance with a technique called function multi-versioning: a function is compiled or written for many of the x86 instruction set extensions, and at run-time a "master function" uses the CPUID instruction to select a version most appropriate for the current CPU. However, as long as the master function detects a non-Intel CPU, it almost always chooses the most basic (and slowest) function to use, regardless of what instruction sets the CPU claims to support. This has netted the system a nickname of "cripple AMD" routine since 2009. As of 2020, Intel's MKL remains the numeric library installed by default along with many pre-compiled mathematical applications on Windows (such as NumPy, SymPy). Although relying on the MKL, MATLAB implemented a workaround starting with Release 2020a which ensures full support for AVX2 by the MKL also for non Intel (AMD) CPUs.

== Details ==
=== Functional categories ===
Intel oneMKL has the following functional categories:

- Linear algebra: BLAS routines are vector-vector (Level 1), matrix-vector (Level 2) and matrix-matrix (Level 3) operations for real and complex single and double precision data. LAPACK consists of tuned LU, Cholesky and QR factorizations, eigenvalue and least squares solvers. MKL also includes Sparse BLAS, ScaLAPACK, Sparse Solver, Extended Eigensolver (FEAST, PARDISO), PBLAS and BLACS. MKL is even better at small dimensions than libxsmm.
  Since oneMKL uses standard interfaces for BLAS and LAPACK, the application which uses other implementations can get better performance on Intel and compatible processors by re-linking with MKL libraries.
- oneMKL includes a variety of Fast Fourier Transforms (FFTs) from 1D to multidimensional, complex to complex, real to complex, and real to real transforms of arbitrary lengths. Applications written with the open source FFTW can be easily ported to MKL by linking with interface wrapper libraries provided as part of MKL for easy migration.
  Cluster versions of LAPACK and FFTs are also available as part of MKL to take advantage of MPI parallelism in addition to single node parallelism from multithreading.
- Vector math functions include computationally intensive core mathematical operations for single and double precision real and complex data types. These are similar to libm functions from compiler libraries but operate on vectors rather than scalars to provide better performance. There are various controls for setting accuracy, error mode and denormalized number handling to customize the behavior of the routines.
- Statistics functions include random number generators and probability distributions, optimized for multicore processors. Also included are compute-intensive in and out-of-core routines to compute basic statistics, estimation of dependencies etc.
- Data fitting functions include splines (linear, quadratic, cubic, look-up, stepwise constant) for 1-dimensional interpolation that can be used in data analytics, geometric modeling and surface approximation applications.
- Partial Differential Equations
- Nonlinear Optimization Problem Solvers

Once, oneMKL included Deep Neural Network functions, but they were removed in version 2020 as a spin-off that originated the open-source Intel oneAPI Deep Neural Network Library.

== See also ==
- OneAPI (compute acceleration)
- List of numerical libraries
- Automatically Tuned Linear Algebra Software (ATLAS)
- GotoBLAS and OpenBLAS
- Integrated Performance Primitives
- Intel Cryptography Primitives Library
- Numerical Library Collection – by NEC for their vector processor
