= List of .NET libraries and frameworks =

This article lists libraries and application frameworks that can be used by languages targeting the Common Language Infrastructure (CLI). The standard libraries supplied with the runtime, including the Base Class Library, are not included.

== Introduction ==
A .NET implementation combines a runtime with a class library and may also include application frameworks and development tools. The principal implementations are modern cross-platform .NET, the Windows-only .NET Framework, and Mono.

Compilers for CLI languages normally produce Common Intermediate Language (CIL) code and metadata stored in assemblies. A runtime loads the assemblies, provides services such as memory management and exception handling, and translates the intermediate code into native instructions. Most .NET applications use just-in-time compilation, while supported workloads can instead use ahead-of-time compilation.

Libraries can be shared across CLI languages because the runtime defines a common type system and calling conventions. Portability still depends on the APIs and native components used by a library: code that relies on Windows-specific interfaces, for example, is not automatically cross-platform.

=== .NET implementations ===
Microsoft documents three main implementations:

- .NET (formerly .NET Core) is the primary, actively developed implementation. It is open source and supports multiple operating systems and workloads.
- .NET Framework is the original Windows implementation. It remains supported in maintenance, but Microsoft recommends modern .NET for new development.
- Mono is a cross-platform implementation oriented toward smaller-footprint environments; it has also been used by Unity.

Each implementation of .NET includes the following components:

- One or more runtime environments, e.g. Common Language Runtime (CLR) for .NET Framework and CoreCLR for .NET
- A class library

The .NET Standard is a set of common APIs that are implemented in the Base Class Library of any .NET implementation. The class library of each implementation must implement the .NET Standard, but may also implement additional APIs. Traditionally, .NET apps targeted a certain version of a .NET implementation, e.g. .NET Framework 4.6. Starting with the .NET Standard, an app can target a version of the .NET Standard and then it could be used (without recompiling) by any implementation that supports that level of the standard. This enables portability across different .NET implementations.

The following table lists the .NET implementations that adhere to the .NET Standard and the version number at which each implementation became compliant with a given version of .NET Standard. For example, according to this table, .NET Core 3.0 was the first version of .NET Core that adhered to .NET Standard 2.1. This means that any version of .NET Core bigger than 3.0 (e.g. .NET Core 3.1) also adheres to .NET Standard 2.1.

Implementation	Versions of the .NET Standard								
Implementation	1.0	1.1	1.2	1.3	1.4	1.5	1.6	2.0	2.1
.NET	1.0							2.0	3.0
.NET Framework	4.5	4.5	4.5.1	4.6	4.6.1	4.7.2 (Note: Nuget mistakenly believes that .NET Framework 4.6.1 adheres to .NET Standard version 1.5 through 2.0.)	4.7.2	4.7.2	—N/a (Note: There are no plans for the .NET Framework to support .NET Standard 2.1)
Mono	4.6							5.4	6.2
Xamarin.iOS	10.0							10.14	12.12
Xamarin.Mac	3.0							3.8	5.12
Xamarin.Android	7.0							8.0	9.3
Universal Windows Platform	8 (Note: Microsoft has removed Windows 8, Windows 8.1, Windows Phone 8 and Windows Phone 8.1 from its tables, as they are deprecated. .NET Foundation has only removed Windows Phone 8.0 and 8.1.)	8	8.1	10	10	10 v1709			—N/a (Note: UWP doesn't support .NET Standard 2.1)
Unity	2018.1								2021.2
Windows Phone	8.1			—N/a					
Windows Phone, via Silverlight	8	—N/a							

== Web frameworks ==
=== ASP.NET ===
First released in 2002, ASP.NET is an open-source server-side web application framework designed for web development to produce dynamic web pages. It is the successor to Microsoft's Active Server Pages (ASP) technology, built on the Common Language Runtime (CLR).

=== ASP.NET Core ===
ASP.NET was completely rewritten in 2016 as a modular web framework, together with other frameworks like Entity Framework. The re-written framework uses the new open-source .NET Compiler Platform (also known by its codename "Roslyn") and is cross platform. The programming models ASP.NET MVC, ASP.NET Web API, and ASP.NET Web Pages (a model using only Razor pages) were merged into a unified MVC 6.

=== Blazor ===
Blazor is a free and open-source web framework that enables developers to create Single-page Web apps using C# and HTML in ASP.NET Razor pages ("components"). Blazor is part of the ASP.NET Core framework. Blazor Server apps are hosted on a web server, while Blazor WebAssembly apps are downloaded to the client's web browser before running. In addition, a Blazor Hybrid framework is available with server-based and client-based application components.

== Numerical libraries ==
=== Open-source numerical libraries ===
==== AForge.NET ====
This is a computer vision and artificial intelligence library. It implements a number of genetic, fuzzy logic and machine learning algorithms with several architectures of artificial neural networks with corresponding training algorithms.

==== ALGLIB ====
This is a cross-platform open source numerical analysis and data processing library. It consists of algorithm collections written in different programming languages (C++, C#, FreePascal, Delphi, VBA) and has dual licensing – commercial and GPL.

==== ILNumerics.ONAL ====
ILNumerics.ONAL is the open-sourced, MIT-licensed numerical core of the ILNumerics development platform, offering a fully managed ONAL (Open Numerical Algorithm Language) implementation—including an official LAPACK translation—with NumPy/MATLAB-style multidimensional arrays, broadcasting, advanced indexing, complex numbers, linear algebra, and FFT support, plus upgrade paths to proprietary auto-parallelizing Accelerator compilers for additional performance. Integrates into Visual Studio and .NET on Windows, Linux and MacOS.

==== Math.NET Numerics ====
This library aims to provide methods and algorithms for numerical computations in science, engineering and everyday use. Covered topics include special functions, linear algebra, probability models, random numbers, interpolation, integral transforms and more. MIT/X11 license.

==== Meta.Numerics ====
This is a library for advanced scientific computation in the .NET Framework.

==== ML.NET ====
This is a free software machine learning library. The preview release of ML.NET included transforms for feature engineering like n-gram creation, and learners to handle binary classification, multi-class classification, and regression tasks. Additional ML tasks like anomaly detection and recommendation systems have since been added, and other approaches like deep learning will be included in future versions.

=== Proprietary numerical libraries ===
==== ILNumerics.Net ====
ILNumerics is a proprietary development platform for technical and scientific applications on .NET, centered on n-dimensional array data types and fundamental mathematical operations for numerical algorithm development, including general mathematics, FFTs, HDF5, optimization, interpolation and linear algebra. It combines numerical computing with interactive 2D and 3D visualization, Visual Studio integration, and performance features such as program-level auto-parallelization and array pipelining for efficient resource use.

==== Measurement Studio ====
This is an integrated suite of UI controls and class libraries for use in developing test and measurement applications. The analysis class libraries provide various digital signal processing, signal filtering, signal generation, peak detection, and other general mathematical functionality.

==== NMath ====
This is a numerical component library for the .NET platform developed by CenterSpace Software. It includes signal processing (FFT) classes, a linear algebra (LAPACK & BLAS) framework, and a statistics package.

== 3D graphics ==
=== Open-source 3D graphics ===
==== Open Toolkit (OpenTK) ====
This is a low-level C# binding for OpenGL, OpenGL ES and OpenAL. It runs on Windows, Linux, Mac OS X, BSD, Android and iOS. It can be used standalone or integrated into a GUI.

==== Windows Presentation Foundation (WPF) ====
This is a graphical subsystem for rendering user interfaces, developed by Microsoft. It also contains a 3D rendering engine. In addition, interactive 2D content can be overlaid on 3D surfaces natively. It only runs on Windows operating systems.

=== Proprietary 3D graphics ===
==== Unity ====
This is a cross-platform game engine developed by Unity Technologies and used to develop video games for PC, consoles, mobile devices and websites.

== Image processing ==
=== AForge.NET ===
This is a computer vision and artificial intelligence library. It implements a number of image processing algorithms and filters. It is released under the LGPLv3 and partly GPLv3 license. Majority of the library is written in C# and thus cross-platform. Functionality of AForge.NET has been extended by the Accord.NET library.

=== Accord.NET ===
This is another computer vision and artificial intelligence library, available under the Gnu Lesser General Public License, version 2.1. It is mainly written in C#.

== Graphical user interface ==
=== Gtk# ===
These are C# wrappers around the underlying GTK+ and GNOME libraries, written in C and available on Linux, MacOS and Windows.

=== Windows Forms (WinForms) ===
This is a Microsoft GUI framework. The original Microsoft implementation runs on Windows operating systems and provides access to Windows User Interface Common Controls by wrapping the Windows API in managed code. The alternative Mono implementation is open source and cross-platform (it runs on Windows, Linux, Unix and OS X). It is mainly compatible with the original implementation but not completely. The library is written in C# in order to avoid Windows dependence. At the Microsoft Connect event on December 4, 2018, Microsoft announced releasing of Windows Forms as open source project on GitHub. It is released under the MIT License. Windows Forms has become available for projects targeting the .NET framework. However, the framework is still available only on Windows platform and the Mono incomplete implementation of WinForms remains the only cross-platform implementation.

=== Windows Presentation Foundation (WPF) ===
This is a graphical subsystem for rendering user interfaces in Windows-based applications by Microsoft. It is based on DirectX and employs XAML, an XML-based language, to define and link various interface elements. WPF applications can be deployed as standalone desktop programs or hosted as an embedded object in a website. At the Microsoft Connect event on December 4, 2018, Microsoft announced releasing of WPF as open source project on GitHub. It is released under the MIT License. Windows Presentation Foundation has become available for projects targeting the .NET framework. However, the system is still available only on Windows platform.

=== Windows UI Library (WinUI) ===
This is a set of Microsoft UI controls and features for the Universal Windows Platform (UWP). At the Microsoft Connect event on December 4, 2018, Microsoft announced releasing of WinUI as open source project on GitHub. WinUI has become available for projects targeting the .NET framework. It is released under the MIT License. However, the library is still available only on Windows platform.

=== Xamarin.Forms ===
This is a cross-platform UI toolkit for development of native user interfaces that can be run on macOS, iOS, Android, and Universal Windows Platform apps.

=== .NET Multi-platform App UI (.NET MAUI) ===
This is a cross-platform UI toolkit announced in May 2020 that originated as a fork of Xamarin.Forms and that can run on Android, iOS, Linux, macOS, Tizen, and Windows. .NET MAUI will run on .NET 6 and later. The source code is licensed under MIT License and available on GitHub.

=== Avalonia ===
This is an open-source cross-platform UI toolkit for development of user interfaces that can be run on Windows, Linux, macOS, iOS, Android, and WebAssembly. The source code is licensed under MIT License and available on GitHub

== Quality assurance ==
=== NUnit ===
This is an open source unit testing framework for .NET, written in C# and thus cross-platform. It is one of many programs in the xUnit family. Licensed under MIT License.

== Object–relational mapping ==
.NET Framework natively provides utilities for object–relational mapping through ADO.NET, a part of the .NET stack since version 1.0. In the earlier years of .NET development, a number of third-party object–relational libraries emerged in order to fill some perceived gaps in the framework. As the framework evolved, additional object–relational tools were added, such as the Entity Framework and LINQ to SQL, both introduced in .NET Framework 3.5. These tools reduced the significance and popularity of third-party object–relational libraries.

=== Entity Framework ===
This is an open source object–relational mapping (ORM) framework for ADO.NET. It was a part of .NET Framework, but since Entity framework version 6 it is separated from .NET framework.

=== NHibernate ===
NHibernate is an object–relational mapper for the .NET platform.
