= List of Visual Basic .NET software and tools =

This is a list of software and programming tools for the Visual Basic .NET programming language, which includes libraries, debuggers, compilers, integrated development environments, numerical libraries, and related projects.

== Libraries and frameworks ==
- .NET — cross-platform successor to .NET Framework
- .NET Framework — original Microsoft framework for building Windows applications
- ADO.NET — data access framework for relational databases
- ASP.NET — framework for building web applications and services
- Avalonia — cross-platform GUI framework
- Blazor — framework for building interactive web UIs
- Entity Framework — object–relational mapper
- IronPython — implementation of Python for the .NET Framework, interoperable with VB.NET
- IronRuby — implementation of Ruby for the .NET Framework, interoperable with VB.NET
- log4net — logging library for .NET
- Measurement Studio — measurement and automation tools extension for Microsoft Visual Studio
- Mono — open-source implementation of the .NET Framework allowing .NET languages (C#, VB.NET, F#) to run cross-platform
- MonoGame — game development
- Json.NET — popular library for working with JSON data
- .NET Multi-platform App UI (.NET MAUI) — building apps that run cross platform from one codebase
- NHibernate — Hibernate object–relational mapping framework for the Microsoft .NET platform
- NuGet — package manager
- SignalR — library for real-time web functionality
- Stride — open-source 2D and 3D cross-platform game engine
- Universal Windows Platform (UWP) — a Microsoft platform for building VB.NET apps
- Uno Platform — allows WinUI and XAML based code to run on iOS, macOS, Linux, Android, Windows and WebAssembly.
- Windows Communication Foundation — framework for building service-oriented applications and interprocess communication
- Windows Forms — GUI class library for Windows-based desktop applications
- Windows Presentation Foundation (WPF) — graphical subsystem for building desktop apps
- Windows Workflow Foundation — framework for building workflow-based applications in VB.NET and other .NET languages

== Integrated development environments ==
- Microsoft Visual Studio
- JetBrains Rider
- SharpDevelop – discontinued free and open source IDE

=== Online IDEs ===
- GitHub Codespaces
- JDoodle
- Replit
- dotnetfiddle.net — online compiler and IDE for C#, F#, and VB.NET
- Visual Basic (VB.NET) Online Compiler – online IDE supporting Visual Basic .NET

== Compilers ==
- Roslyn — open-source compiler platform for C# and Visual Basic
- Visual Studio compiler
- Mono VB.NET compiler — discontinued open-source Visual Basic .NET compiler

== AI and machine learning ==
- Accord.NET — framework for scientific computing, computer vision, and machine learning
- AForge.NET — computer vision and artificial intelligence library
- CNTK (Microsoft Cognitive Toolkit) — deep learning framework developed by Microsoft, with .NET bindings.
- ML.NET — open-source and cross-platform machine learning framework
- ONNX Runtime — high-performance scoring engine for machine learning models with .NET API support

== Numerical libraries ==
- Accord.NET
- ALGLIB
- ILNumerics.Net
- IMSL Numerical Libraries
- Math.NET Numerics
- Measurement Studio
- Meta.Numerics
- NAG Numerical Library
- NMath

== Build and automation tools ==
- MSBuild
- NAnt

== Debugging tools ==
- Visual Studio Debugger — debugger included in Visual Studio
- WinDbg — Microsoft debugger for Windows applications
- dotTrace — JetBrains performance and memory profiler
- dotMemory — JetBrains memory profiler
- NProfiler — performance profiler for Visual Basic .NET

== Unit testing ==
- NUnit
- Visual Studio Unit Testing Framework (MSTest)
- xUnit.net

== See also ==
- List of .NET libraries and frameworks
- List of C# software
- List of C++ software and tools
- List of C software and tools
- List of Java frameworks
- List of JavaScript libraries and List of JavaScript-based web frameworks
- List of Python software
- List of Ruby software and tools
- List of computer books and List of software programming journals
