= At sign =

Typographical symbol (@)

@o

At sign
- In Unicode: U+0040 @ COMMERCIAL AT (&commat;)

Related
- See also: U+FF20 ＠ FULLWIDTH COMMERCIAL AT; U+FE6B ﹫ SMALL COMMERCIAL AT

The at sign (@) is a typographical symbol used as an accounting and invoice abbreviation meaning "at a rate of" (e.g. 7 widgets @ £2 per widget = £14), and now seen more widely in email addresses and social media platform handles. Most languages have their own name for the symbol.

Although not included on the keyboard layout of the earliest commercially successful typewriters, it was on at least one 1889 model and the very successful Underwood models from the "Underwood No. 5" in 1900 onward. It started to be used in email addresses in the 1970s, and is now routinely included on most types of computer keyboards.

== History ==
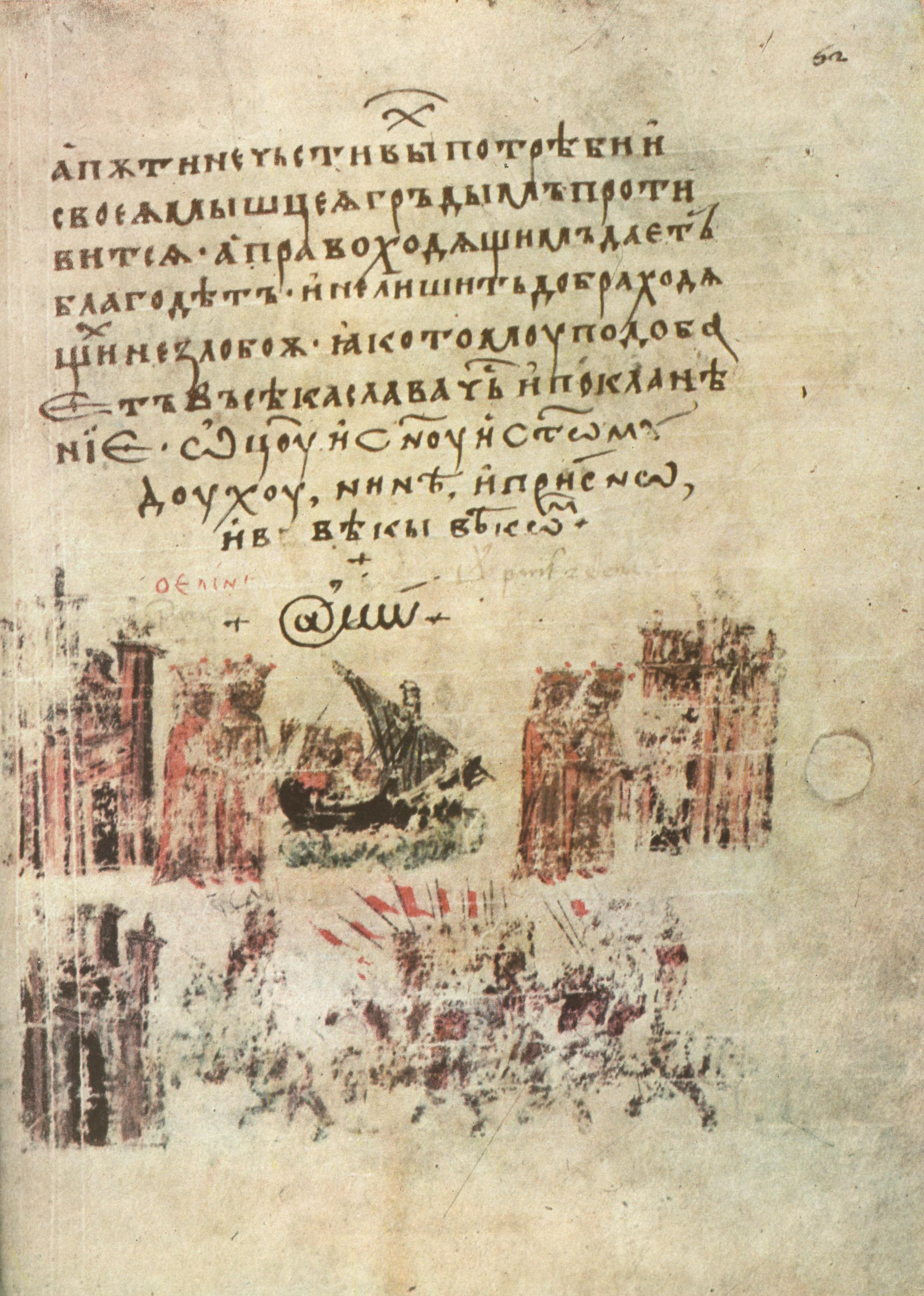
@ symbol used as the initial "a" for the amin (amen) formula in the Bulgarian translation of the Manasses Chronicle, c. 1345

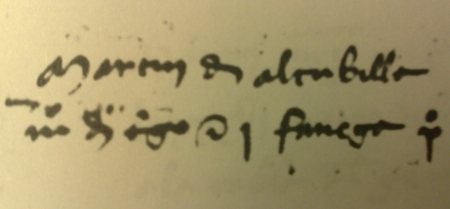
The Aragonese @ symbol used in the 1448 "taula de Ariza" registry to denote a wheat shipment from Castile to the Kingdom of Aragon

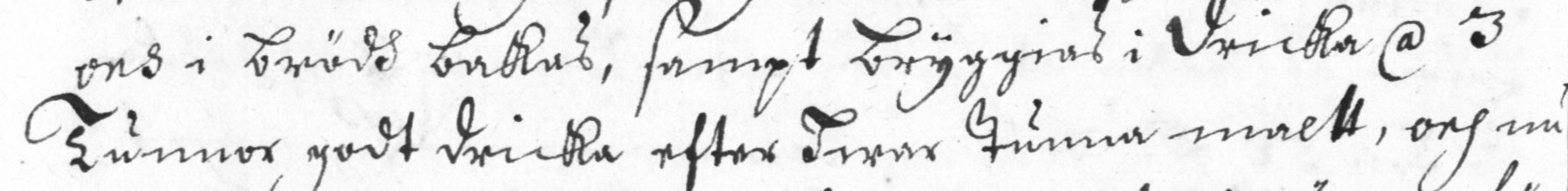
@ used to signify French "à" ("at") from a 1674 protocol from a Swedish court (Arboga rådhusrätt och magistrat)

The earliest yet discovered symbol in this shape is found in a 1345 Bulgarian translation of a Greek chronicle written by Constantinos Manasses. Held today in the Vatican Apostolic Library, the initial letter of the word амин [amen] looks like an at sign.

The symbol has long been used in Catalan, Spanish and Portuguese as an abbreviation of arroba, a unit of weight equivalent to 25 pounds, and derived from the Arabic expression of "the quarter" (الربع pronounced ar-rubʿ). A symbol resembling an @ is found in the Spanish "Taula de Ariza", a registry to denote a wheat shipment from Castile to Aragon, in 1448. The historian Giorgio Stabile reports having traced the @ symbol to the 16th century, in a mercantile document sent by Florentine Francesco Lapi from Seville to Rome on May 4, 1536, stating that the symbol was interpreted to mean amphora (anfora), a unit of weight and volume based upon the capacity of the standard amphora jar since the 6th century. The document is about commerce with Pizarro, in particular the price of an @ of wine in Peru.

The symbol could also mean adi (standard Italian addì, i. e. 'on the day of') as used on a health pass in Northern Italy in 1667.

In 2010, the Museum of Modern Art (MoMA) added the @ symbol to its design collection. In 2025, it was also included in MoMA's Pirouette: Turning Points in Design, an exhibition of "widely recognized design icons [...] highlighting pivotal moments in design history," alongside the I ♥ NY logo, Google map pins, and original 1980s Mac GUI icons, and the NASA Worm insignia.

== Name ==
The name of the symbol arises from its original use in showing quantities and their price per unit – for example, "10 widgets @ £1.50 each". The precise origin of the symbol is uncertain.

The absence of a single English word for the symbol has prompted some writers to use the French arobase, to coin new words such as ampersat and asperand, or to use the (visual) onomatopoeia strudel, but none of these have achieved wide use.

== Modern use ==
=== Commercial usage ===
In contemporary English usage, @ is a commercial symbol, meaning at and at the rate of or at the price of. It has rarely been used in financial ledgers, and is not used in standard typography.

=== Trademark ===
In 2012, "@" was registered as a trademark with the German Patent and Trade Mark Office. A cancellation request was filed in 2013, and the cancellation was ultimately confirmed by the German Federal Patent Court in 2017.

=== Email addresses ===
A common contemporary use of @ is in email addresses (using the SMTP system), as in jdoe@example.com (the user jdoe located at the domain example.com). Ray Tomlinson of BBN Technologies is credited for having introduced this usage in 1971. This idea of the symbol representing located at in the form user@host is also seen in other tools and protocols; for example, it's used in some command-line utilities that connect to a remote host, such as Secure Shell (ssh jdoe@example.net tries to establish a Secure Shell connection to the computer with the hostname example.net using the username jdoe).

On web pages, organizations often obscure the email addresses of their members or employees by omitting the @. This practice, known as address munging, attempts to make the email addresses less vulnerable to spam programs that scan the internet for them.

=== Social media ===
On many social media platforms and forums, usernames or handles prefixed with an @ (in the form @johndoe) are interpreted as mentions of that user and may be treated specially.

On online forums without threaded discussions, @ is commonly used to denote a reply; for instance: @Jane to respond to a comment Jane made earlier. Similarly, in some cases, @ is used for "attention" in email messages originally sent to someone else. For example, if an email was sent from Catherine to Steve, but in the body of the email, Catherine wants to make Keirsten aware of something, Catherine will start the line @Keirsten to signal to Keirsten that the following sentence concerns her. This also helps with mobile email users who might not see bold or color in email.

In microblogging (such as on Twitter, GNU social- and ActivityPub-based microblogs), an @ before the user name is used to send publicly readable replies (e.g. @otheruser: Message text here). The blog and client system interpret these as links to the user in question. When included as part of a person's or company's contact details, an @ symbol followed by a name is normally understood to refer to a Twitter handle. A similar use of the @ symbol was added to Facebook on September 15, 2009. In Internet Relay Chat (IRC), it is shown before users' nicknames to denote they have operator status on a channel.

=== Computer languages ===
@ is used in various programming languages and other computer languages, although there is not a consistent theme to its usage. For example:

- In ActionScript, @ is used in XML parsing and traversal as a string prefix to identify attributes in contrast to child elements.
- In Ada 2022, @ is the target name symbol, an abbreviation of the LHS of an assignment; it is used to avoid repetition of potentially long names in assignment statements. For example: A_Very_Long_Variable_Name := A_Very_Long_Variable_Name + 1; is shortened to A_Very_Long_Variable_Name := @ + 1;, increasing readability.
- In ALGOL 68, the @ symbol is brief form of the at keyword; it is used to change the lower bound of an array. For example: arrayx[@88] refers to an array starting at index 88.
- In Dyalog APL, @ is used as a functional way to modify or replace data at specific locations in an array.
- In the ASP.NET MVC Razor template markup syntax, the @ character denotes the start of code statement blocks or the start of text content.
- In Assembly language, @ is sometimes used as a dereference operator.
- In CSS, @ is used in special statements outside of a CSS block.
- In C#, it denotes "verbatim strings", where no characters are escaped and two double-quote characters represent a single double-quote. As a prefix it also allows keywords to be used as identifiers, a form of stropping.
- In D, it denotes function attributes: like: @safe, @nogc, user defined @('from_user') which can be evaluated at compile time (with __traits) or @property to declare properties, which are functions that can be syntactically treated as if they were fields or variables.
- In DIGITAL Command Language, the @ character was the command used to execute a command procedure. To run the command procedure VMSINSTAL.COM, one would type @VMSINSTAL at the command prompt.
- In the Domain Name System (DNS), @ is used to represent the $ORIGIN, typically the "root" of the domain without a prefixed sub-domain. (Ex: wikipedia.org vs. www.wikipedia.org)
- In Forth, it is used to fetch values from the address on the top of the stack. The operator is pronounced as "fetch".
- In Haskell, it is used in so-called as-patterns. This notation can be used to give aliases to patterns, making them more readable.
- in HTML, it can be encoded as &commat;
- In J, denotes function composition.
- In Java, it has been used to denote annotations, a kind of metadata, since version 5.0.
- In Julia, it denotes the invocation of a macro.
- In LiveCode, it is prefixed to a parameter to indicate that the parameter is passed by reference.
- In an LXDE autostart file (as used, for example, on the Raspberry Pi computer), @ is prefixed to a command to indicate that the command should be automatically re-executed if it crashes.
- In a Makefile, @ specifies to not output the command before it is executed.
- In ML, it denotes list concatenation.
- In modal logic, specifically when representing possible worlds, @ is sometimes used as a logical symbol to denote the actual world (the world we are "at").
- In Objective-C, @ is prefixed to language-specific keywords such as @implementation and to form string literals.
- In InterSystems ObjectScript, @ is the indirection operator, enabling dynamic runtime substitution of part or all of a command line, a command, or a command argument.
- In Pascal, @ is the "address of" operator (it tells the location at which a variable is found).
- In Perl, @ prefixes variables which contain arrays @array, including array slices @array[2..5,7,9] and hash slices @hash{'foo', 'bar', 'baz'} or @hash{qw(foo bar baz)}. This use is known as a sigil.
- In PHP, it is used just before an expression to make the interpreter suppress errors that would be generated from that expression.
- In Python 2.4 and up, it is used to decorate a function (wrap the function in another one at creation time). In Python 3.5 and up, it is also used as an overloadable matrix multiplication operator.
- In R and S-PLUS, it is used to extract slots from S4 objects.
- In Razor, it is used for C# code blocks.
- In Ruby, it functions as a sigil: @ prefixes instance variables, and @@ prefixes class variables.
- In Rust, it is used to bind values matched by a pattern to a variable.
- In Scala, it is used to denote annotations (as in Java), and also to bind names to subpatterns in pattern-matching expressions.
- In Swift, @ prefixes "annotations" that can be applied to classes or members. Annotations tell the compiler to apply special semantics to the declaration like keywords, without adding keywords to the language.
- In T-SQL, @ prefixes variables and @@ prefixes "niladic" system functions.
- In several xBase-type programming languages, like DBASE, FoxPro/Visual FoxPro and Clipper, it is used to denote position on the screen. For example: @1,1 SAY "HELLO" to show the word "HELLO" in line 1, column 1.
  - In FoxPro/Visual FoxPro, it is also used to indicate explicit pass by reference of variables when calling procedures or functions (but it is not an address operator).
- In a Windows Batch file, an @ at the start of a line suppresses the echoing of that command. In other words, is the same as ECHO OFF applied to the current line only. Normally a Windows command is executed and takes effect from the next line onward, but @ is a rare example of a command that takes effect immediately. It is most commonly used in the form @echo off which not only switches off echoing but prevents the command line itself from being echoed.
- In Windows PowerShell, @ is used as array operator for array and hash table literals and for enclosing here-string literals.
- The Vue template language uses @ as a short-hand for the v-on event handler directive

=== Gender neutrality in Spanish ===
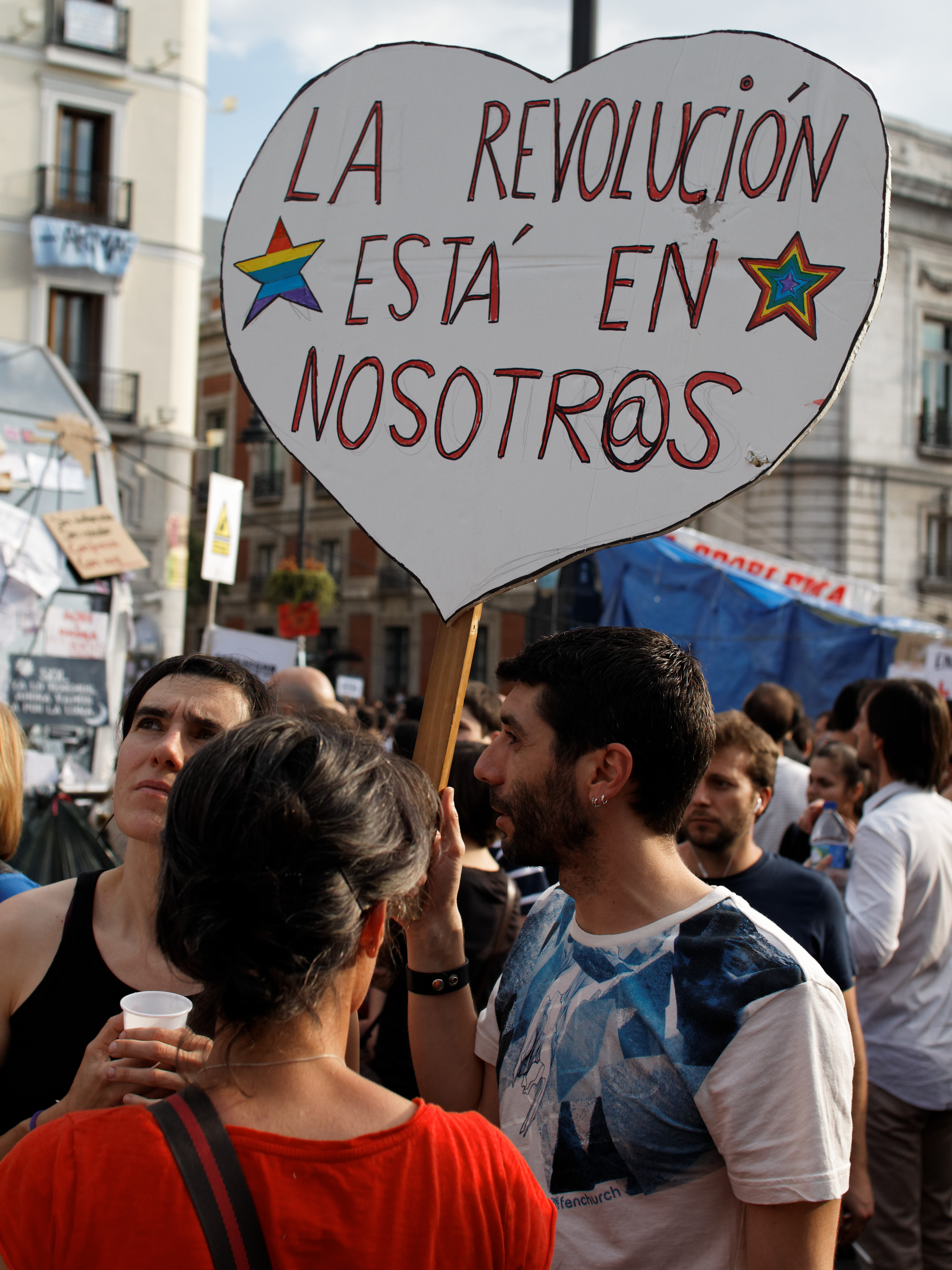
Protester with banner showing "La revolución está en nosotr@s"

In Spanish, where many words end in "-o" when in the masculine gender and end "-a" in the feminine, @ is sometimes used as a gender-neutral substitute for the default "o" ending. For example, the word amigos traditionally represents not only male friends, but also a mixed group, or where the genders are not known. The proponents of gender-inclusive language would replace it with amig@s in these latter two cases, and use amigos only when the group referred to is all-male and amigas only when the group is all female. The Real Academia Española disapproves of this usage.

=== Other uses and meanings ===
Bicameral @ letter as used in the Koalib language

X-SAMPA uses an @ as a substitute for ə, which it resembles in some fonts.

- In (especially English) scientific and technical literature, @ is used to describe the conditions under which data are valid or a measurement has been made. E.g. the density of saltwater may read d = 1.050 g/cm^{3} @ 15 °C (read "at" for @), density of a gas d = 0.150 g/L @ 20 °C, 1 bar, or noise of a car 81 dB @ 80 km/h (speed).
- In philosophical logic, '@' is used to denote the actual world (in contrast to non-actual possible worlds). Analogously, a 'designated' world in a Kripke model may be labelled '@'.
- In chemical formulae, @ is used to denote trapped atoms or molecules. For instance, La@C_{60} means lanthanum inside a fullerene cage. See article Endohedral fullerene for details.
- In Malagasy, @ is an informal abbreviation for the prepositional form amin'ny.
- In Malay, @ is an informal abbreviation for the word "atau", meaning "or" in English.
- In genetics, @ is the abbreviation for locus, as in IGL@ for immunoglobulin lambda locus.
- In the Koalib language of Sudan, @ is used as a letter in Arabic loanwords. The Unicode Consortium rejected a proposal to encode it separately as a letter in Unicode. SIL International uses Private Use Area code points U+F247 and U+F248 for lowercase and capital versions, although they have marked this PUA representation as deprecated since September 2014.
- A schwa, as the actual schwa character "ə" may be difficult to produce on many computers. It is used in this capacity in some ASCII IPA schemes, including SAMPA and X-SAMPA.
- In leet it may substitute for the letter "A".
- It is frequently used in typing and text messaging as an abbreviation for "at".
- In Portugal it may be used in typing and text messaging with the meaning "french kiss" (linguado).
- In online discourse, @ is used by some anarchists as a substitute for the traditional circle-A.
- Algebraic notation for the Crazyhouse chess variant: An @ between a piece and a square denotes a piece dropped onto that square from the player's reserve.
- In many roguelike games, @ is used to represent the player character.
- In Spain and Portugal, the Arroba, abbreviated using the @ sign, is a customary unit of weight, mass or volume. The name arroba is used in both countries for the @ sign more generally.

== Names in other languages ==
In many languages other than English, although most typewriters included the symbol, the use of @ was less common before email became widespread in the mid-1990s. Consequently, it is often perceived in those languages as denoting "the Internet", computerization, or modernization in general. Naming the symbol after animals is also common.

- In Afrikaans, it is called aapstert, meaning 'monkey tail', similar to the Dutch use of the word (aap in apenstaart, is the word for 'monkey' or 'ape' in Dutch, stert comes from the Dutch staart).
- In Arabic, it is آتْ (at).
- In Armenian, it is շնիկ (shnik), which means 'puppy'.
- In Azerbaijani, it is ət (pronounced [æt]) which means 'meat', though most likely it is a phonetic transliteration of at.
- In Basque, it is a bildua ('wrapped A').
- In Belarusian, it is called сьлімак (ślimak, meaning 'helix' or 'snail').
- In Bengali, it is called হারে, meaning 'at a rate'.
- In Bosnian, it is ludo a ('crazy A').
- In Bulgarian, it is called кльомба (klyomba – 'a badly written letter'), маймунско а (maymunsko a – 'monkey A'), маймунка (maimunka – 'little monkey'), or баница (banitsa – a pastry roll often made in a shape similar to the character)
- In Catalan, it is called arrova (a unit of measure) or ensaïmada (a Mallorcan pastry, because of the similar shape of this food).
- In Chinese:
  - In mainland China, it used to be called 圈A (pronounced quān A), meaning 'circled A' / 'enclosed A', or 花A (pronounced huā A), meaning 'lacy/flowered A', and sometimes as 小老鼠 (pronounced xiǎo lǎoshǔ), meaning 'little mouse'. Nowadays, for most of China's youth, it is called 艾特 (pronounced ài tè), which is a phonetic transcription of at.
  - In Taiwan, it is 小老鼠 (pronounced xiǎo lǎoshǔ), meaning 'little mouse'.
  - In Hong Kong and Macau, it is at.
- In Croatian, it is most often referred to by the English word at (pronounced et), and less commonly and more formally, with the preposition pri (with the addressee in the nominative case, not locative as per usual rection of pri), meaning 'at', 'chez' or 'by'. Informally, it is called a manki, coming from the local pronunciation of the English word monkey. Note that the Croatian words for monkey, majmun, opica, jopec, šimija are not used to denote the symbol, except seldom the latter words regionally.
- In Czech it is called zavináč, which means 'rollmops'; the same word is used in Slovak.
- In Danish, it is snabel-a ('elephant's trunk A'). It is not used for prices, where in Danish à means 'at (per piece)'.
- In Dutch, it is called apenstaart ('monkey's tail'). The a is the first character of the Dutch word aap which means 'monkey' or 'ape'; apen is the plural of aap. However, the use of the English at has become common in Dutch.
- In Esperanto, it is called ĉe-signo ('at' – for the email use, with an address like "zamenhof@esperanto.org" pronounced zamenhof ĉe esperanto punkto org), po-signo ('each' – refers only to the mathematical use), or heliko (meaning 'snail').
- In Estonian, it is called ätt, from the English word at.
- In Faroese, it is kurla, hjá ('at'), tranta, or snápil-a ('[elephant's] trunk A').
- In Finnish, it was originally called taksamerkki ("fee sign") or yksikköhinnan merkki ("unit price sign"), but these names are long obsolete and now rarely understood. Nowadays, it is officially ät-merkki, according to the national standardization institute SFS; frequently also spelled at-merkki. Other names include kissanhäntä ('cat's tail') and miuku mauku ('miaow-meow') or short: miu-mau.
- In French, it is now officially the arobase (also spelled arrobase or arrobe), or a commercial (though this is most commonly used in French-speaking Canada, and normally only used when quoting prices). Its origin is the same as that of the Spanish word, which could be derived from the Arabic ar-roub (اَلرُّبْع). In France, it is also common (especially for younger generations) to say the English word at when spelling out an email address. In everyday Québec French, one often hears a commercial when sounding out an e-mail address, while TV and radio hosts are more likely to use arobase.
- In Georgian, it is at, spelled ეთ–ი (კომერციული ეთ–ი, ḳomerciuli et-i).
- In German, it has sometimes been referred to as Klammeraffe (meaning 'spider monkey') or Affenschwanz (meaning 'monkey tail'). Klammeraffe and Affenschwanz refer to the similarity of @ to the tail of a monkey. More recently, it is commonly referred to as at, as in English.
- In Greek, it is called παπάκι meaning 'duckling'.
- In Greenlandic, an Inuit language, it is called aajusaq meaning 'A-like' or 'something that looks like A'.
- In Hebrew, it is colloquially known as שְׁטְרוּדֶל (shtrúdel), due to the visual resemblance to a cross-section cut of a strudel cake. The normative term, invented by the Academy of the Hebrew Language, is כְּרוּכִית (krukhít), which is another Hebrew word for 'strudel', but is rarely used.
- In Hindi, it is at, from the English word.
- In Hungarian, it is called kukac (a playful synonym for 'worm' or 'maggot').
- In Icelandic, it is referred to as atmerkið ('the at sign') or hjá, which is a direct translation of the English word at.
- In Indian English, speakers often say at the rate of (with e-mail addresses quoted as "example at the rate of example.com").
- In Indonesian, it is usually et. Variations exist – especially if verbal communication is very noisy – such as a bundar and a bulat (both meaning 'circled A'), a keong ('snail A'), and (most rarely) a monyet ('monkey A').
- In Irish, it is ag (meaning 'at') or comhartha @/ag (meaning 'at sign').
- In Italian, it is chiocciola ('snail') or a commerciale, sometimes at (pronounced more often [ˈɛt] and rarely [ˈat]) or ad.
- In Japanese, it is called atto māku (アットマーク, from the English words at mark). The word is wasei-eigo, a loan word from the English language. It is also referred to in slang as narutomaki (なるとまき), the name for a type of white fishcake with a pink swirl on the inside.
- In Kazakh, it is officially called айқұлақ (aıqulaq, 'earlobe').
- In Korean, it is called golbaeng-i (골뱅이, a dialectal form of whelk).
- In Kurdish, it is at or et (Latin Hawar script), ئەت (Perso-Arabic Sorani script) coming from the English word at.
- In Latvian, it is pronounced the same as in English, but, since in Latvian [æ] is written as "e" (not "a" as in English), it is sometimes written as et.
- In Lithuanian, it is pronounced eta (equivalent to the English at).
- In Luxembourgish it used to be called Afeschwanz ('monkey tail'), but due to widespread use, it is now called at, as in English.
- In Macedonian, it is called мајмунче (majmunče, [ˈmajmuntʃɛ], 'little monkey').
- In Malaysia, it is called alias when it is used in names and di when it is used in email addresses, di being the Malay word for 'at'. It is also commonly used to abbreviate atau which means 'or', 'either'.
- In Morse code, it is known as a "commat", consisting of the Morse code for the "A" and "C" which run together as one character: ▄ ▄▄▄ ▄▄▄ ▄ ▄▄▄ ▄ . The symbol was added in 2004 for use with email addresses, the only official change to Morse code since World War I.
- In Norwegian, it is officially called krøllalfa ('curly alpha' or 'alpha twirl'), and commonly as alfakrøll. Sometimes snabel-a, the Swedish/Danish name (which means 'trunk A', as in 'elephant's trunk'), is used. Commonly, people will call the symbol [æt] (as in English), particularly when giving their email addresses. The computer manufacturer Norsk Data used it as the command prompt, and it was often called grisehale (pig's tail).
- In Persian, it is ات, at, from the English word.
- In Polish, it is commonly called małpa ('monkey'). Rarely, the English word at is used.
- In Portuguese, it is called arroba (from the Arabic ar-roub, اَلرُّبْع). The word arroba is also used for a weight measure in Portuguese. One arroba is equivalent to 32 old Portuguese pounds, approximately 14.7 kg (32 lb), and both the weight and the symbol are called arroba. In Brazil, cattle are still priced by the arroba – now rounded to 15 kg (33 lb). This naming is because the at sign was used to represent this measure.
- In Romanian, it is most commonly called at, but also colloquially called coadă de maimuță ('monkey tail') or a-rond. The latter is commonly used, and it comes from the word round (from its shape), but that is nothing like the mathematical symbol A-rond (rounded A). Others call it aron, or la (Romanian word for 'at').

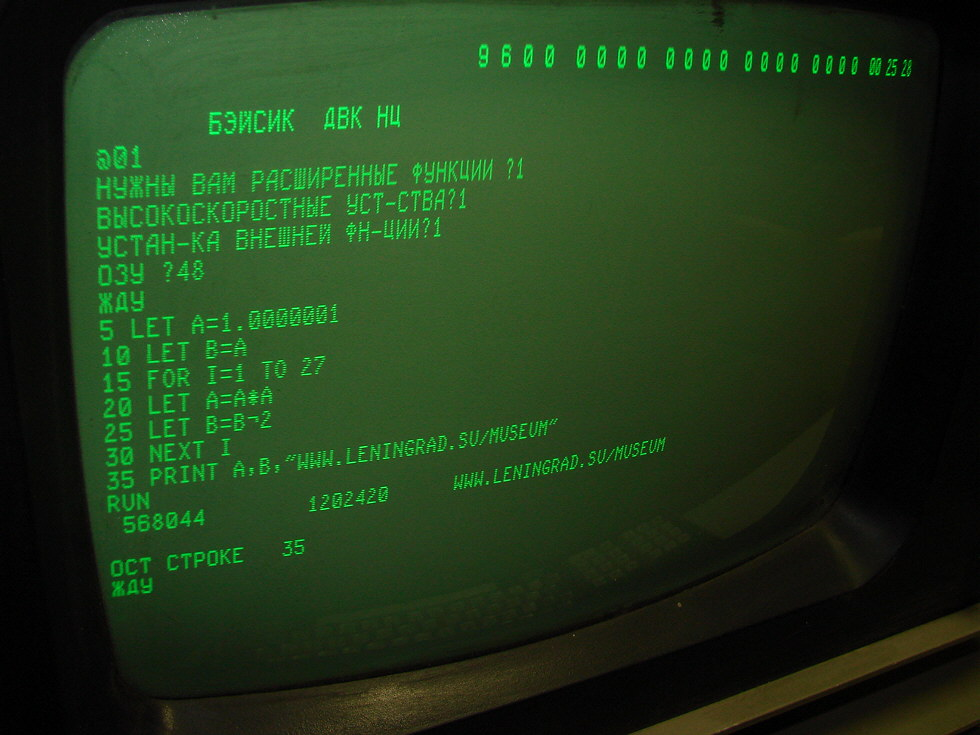
@ on a DVK Soviet computer (c. 1984)

- In Russian, it is commonly called соба[ч]ка (soba[ch]ka – '[little] dog').
- In Serbian, it is called лудо А (ludo A – 'crazy A'), мајмунче (majmunče – 'little monkey'), or мајмун (majmun – 'monkey').
- In Slovak, it is called zavináč ('rollmop', a pickled fish roll, as in Czech).
- In Slovenian, it is called afna (an informal word for 'monkey').
- In Spanish-speaking countries, it is called arroba (from the Arabic ar-roub, which denotes a pre-metric unit of weight).
- In Sámi (North Sámi), it is called bussáseaibi meaning 'cat's tail'.
- In Swedish, it is called snabel-a ('elephant's trunk A') or simply at, as in the English language. Less formally it is also known as kanelbulle ('cinnamon roll') or alfakrull ('alpha curl').
- In Swiss German, it is commonly called Affenschwanz ('monkey-tail'). However, the use of the English word at has become increasingly popular in Swiss German, as with Standard German.
- In Tagalog, the word at means 'and', so the symbol is used like an ampersand in colloquial writing such as text messages (e.g. magluto @ kumain, 'cook and eat').
- In Thai, it is commonly called at, as in English.
- In Turkish, it is commonly called et, a variant pronunciation of English at.
- In Ukrainian, it is commonly called ет (et – from English 'at') or равлик (ravlyk), which means 'snail'.
- In Urdu, it is ایٹ (at).
- In Uzbek, it is commonly called kuchukcha ('little dog').
- In Vietnamese, it is called a còng ('bent A') in the north and a móc ('hooked A') in the south.
- In Welsh, it is sometimes known as a malwen or malwoden (both meaning 'snail').

== Unicode ==
- U+0040 @ COMMERCIAL AT (&commat;)
- U+FF20 ＠ FULLWIDTH COMMERCIAL AT
- U+FE6B ﹫ SMALL COMMERCIAL AT

== See also ==
- ASCII
- Circle-A – a symbol of Anarchism
- Enclosed A (U+24B6 Ⓐ CIRCLED LATIN CAPITAL LETTER A, U+24D0 ⓐ CIRCLED LATIN SMALL LETTER A)
