= OpenCV =

Computer vision library

- Original authors: Intel, Willow Garage, Itseez
- Release: June 2000; 26 years ago
- Stable release: 5.0.0 / 6 June 2026; 2 months ago
- Written in: C, C++, Python, Java, assembly language
- Operating system: Cross-platform: Windows, Linux, macOS, FreeBSD, NetBSD, OpenBSD; Android, iOS, Maemo, BlackBerry 10
- Platform: IA-32, x86-64
- Size: ~200 MB
- Available in: English
- Type: Library
- License: Apache
- Website: opencv.org, opencv.ai
- Repository: github.com/opencv/opencv

OpenCV (Open Source Computer Vision Library) is a library of programming functions mainly for real-time computer vision. Originally developed by Intel, it was later supported by Willow Garage, then Itseez (which was later acquired by Intel). The library is cross-platform and licensed as free and open-source software under Apache License 2. Starting in 2011, OpenCV features GPU acceleration for real-time operations.

== History ==
Officially launched in 1999, the OpenCV project was initially an Intel Research initiative to advance CPU-intensive applications, part of a series of projects including real-time ray tracing and 3D display walls. The main contributors to the project included a number of optimization experts in Intel Russia, as well as Intel's Performance Library Team. In the early days of OpenCV, the goals of the project were described as:

- Advance vision research by providing not only open but also optimized code for basic vision infrastructure. No more reinventing the wheel.
- Disseminate vision knowledge by providing a common infrastructure that developers could build on, so that code would be more readily readable and transferable.
- Advance vision-based commercial applications by making portable, performance-optimized code available for free – with a license that did not require code to be open or free itself.

The first alpha version of OpenCV was released to the public at the IEEE Conference on Computer Vision and Pattern Recognition in 2000, and five betas were released between 2001 and 2005. The first 1.0 version was released in 2006. A version 1.1 "pre-release" was released in October 2008.

The second major release of the OpenCV was in October 2009. OpenCV 2 includes major changes to the C++ interface, aiming at easier, more type-safe patterns, new functions, and better implementations for existing ones in terms of performance (especially on multi-core systems). Official releases now occur every six months and development is now done by an independent Russian team supported by commercial corporations.

In August 2012, support for OpenCV was taken over by a non-profit foundation, OpenCV.org, which maintains a developer and user site.

In May 2016, Intel signed an agreement to acquire Itseez, a leading developer of OpenCV.

== Applications ==
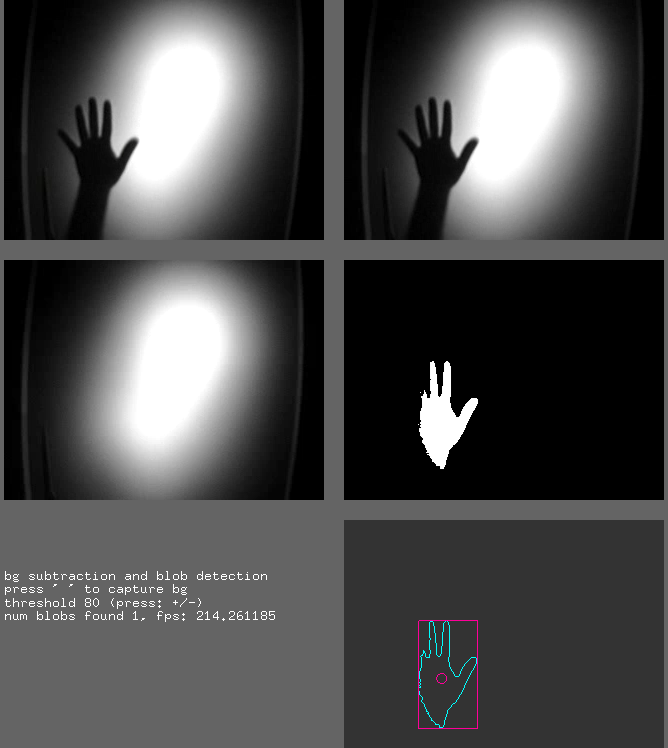
openFrameworks running the OpenCV add-on example

OpenCV's application areas include:

- 2D and 3D feature toolkits
- Egomotion estimation
- Facial recognition system
- Gesture recognition
- Human–computer interaction (HCI)
- Mobile robotics
- Motion understanding
- Object detection
- Segmentation and recognition
- Stereopsis stereo vision: depth perception from 2 cameras
- Structure from motion (SFM)
- Motion video tracking
- Augmented reality

To support some of the above areas, OpenCV includes a statistical machine learning library that contains:

- Boosting
- Decision tree learning
- Gradient boosting trees
- Expectation-maximization algorithm
- k-nearest neighbor algorithm
- Naive Bayes classifier
- Artificial neural networks
- Random forest
- Support vector machine (SVM)
- Deep neural networks (DNN)

== Programming language ==
OpenCV is written in the programming language C++, as is its primary interface. There are language bindings in Python, Java, and MATLAB/Octave. The application programming interface (API) for these interfaces can be found in the online documentation. Wrapper libraries in several languages have been developed to encourage adoption by a wider audience. In version 3.4, JavaScript bindings for a selected subset of OpenCV functions were released as OpenCV.js, to be used for web platforms.

== Hardware acceleration ==
If the library finds Intel's Integrated Performance Primitives on the system, it will use these proprietary optimized routines to accelerate itself.

A Compute Unified Device Architecture (CUDA) based graphics processing unit (GPU) interface has been in progress since September 2010.

An OpenCL-based GPU interface has been in progress since October 2012, documentation for version 2.4.13.3 can be found at docs.opencv.org.

An IPU may also utilise OpenCV hardware acceleration.

== See also ==
- AForge.NET – computer vision library for the Common Language Runtime of .NET Framework and Mono
- CVIPtools – complete graphical user interface (GUI) based computer-vision and image-processing software environment, with C function libraries, a Component Object Model (COM) based dynamic-link library (DLL), and two utility programs for algorithm development and batch processing
- Dlib – open-source machine learning and computer vision library written in C++
- List of free and open-source software packages
- List of robotics software
- MediaPipe – open-source framework from Google
- Open-source artificial intelligence
- OpenNN – artificial neural network library written in C++
- Point Cloud Library – library for point cloud processing
- Robot Operating System (ROS) – uses OpenCV as its primary computer vision package
- VXL – alternative library written in C++
