= ASP.NET Core =

Open-source web application framework

- Original author: Microsoft
- Developers: .NET Foundation and the open source community
- Release: June 7, 2016; 10 years ago
- Stable release: 10.0.0 / 11 November 2025; 12 months ago
- Written in: C#
- Operating system: Linux, macOS, Windows
- Platform: Cross-platform
- Type: Web framework
- License: MIT License
- Website: dotnet.microsoft.com/apps/aspnet
- Repository: github.com/dotnet/aspnetcore

ASP.NET Core is an open-source modular web-application framework. It is a redesign of ASP.NET that unites the previously separate ASP.NET MVC and ASP.NET Web API into a single programming model. Despite being a new framework, built on a new web stack, it does have a high degree of concept compatibility with ASP.NET. The ASP.NET Core framework supports side-by-side versioning so that different applications being developed on a single machine can target different versions of ASP.NET Core. This was not possible with previous versions of ASP.NET. ASP.NET Core initially ran on both the Windows-only .NET Framework and the cross-platform .NET. However, support for the .NET Framework was dropped beginning with ASP.Net Core 3.0. ASP.NET Core supports programming in C#, F#, and Visual Basic.

Blazor is a recent, optional component that supports WebAssembly. Since version 5.0, Blazor has dropped support for some older web browsers, including Microsoft Edge Legacy and Internet Explorer 11.

== Release history ==
Version number	Release date	End of support	Supported Visual Studio Version(s)
1.0	2016-06-27	2019-06-27	Visual Studio 2015, 2017
1.1	2016-11-18	2019-06-27	Visual Studio 2015, 2017
2.0	2017-08-14	2018-10-01	Visual Studio 2017
2.1 long-term support	2018-05-30	2021-08-21 (Note: Supported on .NET Framework until 2025-01-14) (Note: Reshipped as ASP.NET Core 2.3)	Visual Studio 2017
2.2	2018-12-04	2019-12-23	Visual Studio 2017 15.9 and 2019 16.0 preview 1
2.3 long-term support (Note: Supported on .NET Framework only)	2025-01-14	2027-04-07	Visual Studio 2017
3.0	2019-09-23	2020-03-03	Visual Studio 2017 and 2019
3.1 long-term support	2019-12-03	2022-12-03	Visual Studio 2019
5.0	2020-11-10	2022-05-08	Visual Studio 2019 16.8
6.0 long-term support	2021-11-08	2024-11-08	Visual Studio 2022
7.0 standard-term support	2022-11-08	2024-05-14	Visual Studio 2022
8.0 long-term support	2023-11-14	2026-11-10	Visual Studio 2022
9.0 standard-term support	2024-11-12	2026-11-10	Visual Studio 2022
10.0 long-term support	2025-11-11	2028-11-14	Visual Studio 2026
Unsupported Supported Latest version

== Naming ==
Originally deemed ASP.NET vNext, the framework was going to be called ASP.NET 5 when ready. However, in order to avoid implying it is an update to the existing ASP.NET framework, Microsoft later changed the name to ASP.NET Core at the 1.0 release.

== Features ==
- No-compile developer experience (i.e. compilation is continuous, so that the developer does not have to invoke the compilation command)
- Modular framework distributed as NuGet packages
- Cloud-optimized runtime (optimized for the internet)
- Host-agnostic via Open Web Interface for .NET (OWIN) support – runs in IIS or standalone
- A unified story for building web UI and web APIs (i.e. both the same)
- A cloud-ready environment-based configuration system
- A lightweight and modular HTTP request pipeline
- Build and run cross-platform ASP.NET Core apps on Windows, Mac, and Linux
- Open-source and community-focused
- Side-by-side app versioning when targeting .NET
- In-built support for dependency injection
- Enhanced Security compared to Asp.Net

== Components ==
- Entity Framework (EF) Core
- Identity Core
- MVC Core
- Razor Core
- SignalR
- Blazor
- Kestrel web server

== See also ==
- .NET Compiler Platform
- Mono
- Visual Studio Code
