= Naked Objects for .NET =

Naked Objects for .NET or Naked Objects MVC is a software framework that builds upon the ASP.NET MVC framework.

As the name suggests, the framework synthesizes two architectural patterns: naked objects and model–view–controller (MVC). These two patterns have been considered as antithetical. However, Trygve Reenskaug (the inventor of the MVC pattern) has made it clear that he does not see it that way, in his foreword to Richard Pawson's PhD thesis on the Naked Objects pattern.

The Naked Objects MVC framework will take a domain model (written as Plain Old CLR Objects) and render it as a complete HTML application without the need for writing any user interface code - by means of a small set of generic View and Controller classes. The framework uses reflection rather than code generation.

The developer may then choose to create customised Views and/or Controllers, using standard ASP.NET MVC patterns, for use where the generic user interface is not suitable.
