= Object-oriented user interface =

Type of user interface

In computing, an object-oriented user interface (OOUI) is a type of user interface based on an object-oriented programming metaphor, and describes most modern operating systems ("object-oriented operating systems") such as MacOS and Unix. In an OOUI, the user interacts explicitly with objects that represent entities in the domain that the application is concerned with. Many vector drawing applications, for example, have an OOUI – the objects being lines, circles and canvases. The user may explicitly select an object, alter its properties (such as size or colour), or invoke other actions upon it (such as to move, copy, or re-align it). If a business application has an OOUI, the user may be selecting and/or invoking actions on objects representing entities in the business domain such as customers, products or orders.

Jakob Nielsen defines the OOUI in contrast to function-oriented interfaces: "Object-oriented interfaces are sometimes described as turning the application inside-out as compared to function-oriented interfaces. The main focus of the interaction changes to become the users' data and other information objects that are typically represented graphically on the screen as icons or in windows."

Dave Collins defines an OOUI as demonstrating three characteristics:

- Users perceive and act on objects
- Users can classify objects based on how they behave
- In the context of what users are trying to do, all the user interface objects fit together into a coherent overall representation

Jef Raskin suggests that the most important characteristic of an OOUI is that it adopts a 'noun-verb', rather than a 'verb-noun' style of interaction, and that this has several advantages in terms of usability.

== Relationship to other user interface ideas ==
There is a great deal of potential synergy between the OOUI concept and other important ideas in user interface design including:

- graphical user interface (GUI)
- direct manipulation interface
- interface metaphor

Many futuristic imaginings of user interfaces rely heavily on OOUI and especially OOGUI concepts. However there are many examples of user interfaces that implement one or more of those other ideas, but which are not in fact OOUIs - though they are often wrongly labelled as OOUIs. Conversely, there are examples of OOUIs that are neither graphical, nor employ direct manipulation techniques, nor employ strong metaphors. For example, the earliest versions of the Smalltalk programming language had a command line interface that was nonetheless also clearly an OOUI, though it subsequently became better known for its pioneering role in the development of GUIs, direct manipulation and visual metaphors.

== Relationship to object-oriented programming ==
Although there are many conceptual parallels between OOUIs and object-oriented programming, it does not follow that an OOUI has to be implemented using an object-oriented programming language.

The guidelines for IBM's Common User Access (CUA), (possibly the most comprehensive attempt at defining a standard for OOUI design) stated that 'while object-oriented programming can facilitate the development of an object-oriented user interface, it is not a pre-requisite. An object-oriented user interface can be developed with more traditional programming languages and tools.'

However, there are strong synergies. Larry Tesler, who left Xerox PARC in 1980 to join Apple underlined the relationship:

Many observers have hypothesized that [the] Smalltalk user interface and the Smalltalk language are separable innovations. Consequently, most systems influenced by the Smalltalk user interface have been engineered without resorting to Smalltalk’s implementation approach. At Apple, after using Pascal to implement six initial applications for Lisa, we discovered compelling reasons to change our programming language to incorporate more ideas from Smalltalk. Lisa applications are now written in the language Clascal, an extension of Pascal featuring objects, classes, subclasses, and procedure invocation by message-passing.

== Relationship to domain object modelling ==
There is also an obvious synergy between the concept of an OOUI and the idea of constructing software from domain objects. However, it does not follow that the objects that a user sees and interacts within an OOUI have to correspond to the domain objects on which the application is built.

The CUA guidelines stated that 'In an object-oriented user interface, the objects that a user works with do not necessarily correspond to the objects or modules of code, that a programmer used to create the product.' The basic design methods described in CUA were refined further into the OVID method which used UML to model the interface.

Mark van Harmelen states that 'Object-oriented user interface design does not require designers to take an object-oriented view of the problem from the beginning of the project. Furthermore, even if designers take an object-oriented perspective throughout, they will benefit from focusing separately on the object model and the object-oriented user interface design.'

By contrast, the naked objects pattern is an approach to the design of applications that, at least in its naive form, enforces a direct correspondence between the objects represented in the OOUI and the underlying domain objects, auto-generating the former from the latter.
