= VXL =

Computer Vision Library

VXL, the Vision-something-Library, is a large collection of open source C++ libraries for computer vision. The idea of the naming is to replace X with one of many letters to obtain the smaller library names, i.e. G (VGL) is a geometry library, N (VNL) is a numerics library, I (VIL) is an image processing library, etc. These libraries can be used for general scientific computing as well as computer vision. Some examples of usage can be seen online.

VXL is a larger-scale software engineering project with roots dating back to traditional computer vision environments from the 1990s, having libraries at multiple levels of complexities, many of them listing OpenCV as one of many dependencies. A similar approach at an even larger scale is taken by Kitware's KWIVER. VXL core libraries are extremely stable and have been used in larger projects, both public and within companies, notably ITK.

== See also ==
- OpenCV
