= NMath =

Microsoft .NET software

- Developer: CenterSpace Software
- Stable release: 7.1 / December 2019; 6 years ago
- Operating system: Windows
- Type: Numerical component libraries
- License: Proprietary
- Website: www.centerspace.net

NMath is a numerical package for the Microsoft .NET Framework. It is developed by CenterSpace Software. Version 1.0 was released in March, 2003 as NMath Core. The current version is called NMath 7.1, released in December, 2019.

NMath is built on MKL, a numerical library from Intel.

As of 2023, NMath sells at US$1,595.

== Features ==
NMath contains vector and matrix classes, complex numbers, factorizations, decompositions, linear programming, minimization, root-finding, structured and sparse matrix, least squares, polynomials, simulated annealing, curve fitting, numerical integration and differentiationing.

== CenterSpace Software ==
CenterSpace Software LLC.
- Company type: Private
- Industry: .NET components
- Headquarters: Corvallis, Oregon
- Products: NMath, NMath Stats
- Website: CenterSpace Software

CenterSpace Software, LLC. is a commercial software development company with headquarters in Corvallis, Oregon, USA, that produces numerical and statistical class libraries for the .NET Framework and the NMath software. CenterSpace also provides advanced software project consulting services.

CenterSpace Software produced the first commercial .NET numerical class library in March, 2003.

Developers at CenterSpace Software wrote the book The Elements of C# Style.

CenterSpace won the Willamette Angel Conference in 2009.

== See also ==
- List of numerical-analysis software
