= ILNumerics =

- Developer: ILNumerics GmbH
- Stable release: v7.4.56 / June 10, 2026; 39 days ago
- Written in: C#, Visual Basic
- Operating system: .NET Framework / Mono, Windows, Linux, MacOS
- Platform: IA-32, x86-64, AnyCPU
- Type: Technical computing, Mathematical software
- License: Platform: Proprietary, Math core: open source (MIT)
- Website: ilnumerics.net

ILNumerics is an open-source domain specific language (DSL) for the implementation of numerical algorithms on the .NET platform and the core of the ILNumerics mathematical development platform / class library. It serves as algebra system for .NET developers, focussing on prototyping of algorithms and their robust implementation into distribution-ready applications using general purpose programming languages (GPL) as C# and Visual Basic. ILNumerics integrates into Visual Studio and aims at supporting the creation of technical applications in commercial and academic environments.

== History ==
ILNumerics started in 2006 as an open source project, originating from Technische Universität Berlin. In 2007 ILNumerics won the BASTA! Innovation Award 2007 as most innovative .NET project in Germany, Switzerland and Austria. After 6 years of open source development, the project added a closed source, proprietary license in 2011, aiming business and academic developers at the same time. The project quickly gained popularity (download numbers and engagement at stackoverflow.com, download counts from website not available). The .NET framework was selected as a managed foundation, since earlier attempts on the Java platform had been abandoned due to technical limitations. Similarly, the .NET framework has not been designed with the focus on requirements of technical application development. ILNumerics added interfaces to popular codes (LAPACK, FFTW), complex numbers and generic mult-dimensional array classes. In 2010 graphical capabilities have been added. Efforts to increase the performance of the technology were introduced in 2011. At the same time, a company was founded to continue the development.

In 2026 the numerical core of the development platform was open-sourced into the ILNumerics.ONAL (Open Numerical Algorithm Language) project and published on GitHub. It serves as a standard implementation and remains to be maintained by ILNumerics. The ONAL standard aims at providing a vendor-neutral, mature and future-proof foundation for numerical algorithm development on .NET. The language was designed to focus on user friendly semantic and functionality while strictly excluding any performance related aspects. Algorithms written in ILNumerics.ONAL remain independent and functioning without proprietary vendor support, while allowing ONAL compatible compilers effortless automatic acceleration.

== ONAL Accelerator Compiler ==
In 2024, the release of ILNumerics version 7.1 introduced the ONAL Accelerator Compiler, a system for the automatic parallelization of numerical array programs written with the ILNumerics DSL. The compiler addresses a common bottleneck in numerical software development by moving parallelization from manually optimized code fragments to autonomous program-level execution. Instead of requiring the programmer to explicitly coordinate parallel tasks, the compiled program organizes its runtime execution in a decentralized, massively parallel, and self-adapting manner across the available hardware resources.

At runtime, the system identifies independent array operations across function and module boundaries and schedules them for concurrent execution on available compute resources, including CPU cores and GPUs. To enable this, the originally sequential program is decomposed into individual segments, corresponding to single or merged array operations, which are later reassembled for asynchronous, parallel execution. Each array operation carries its own execution logic: it evaluates the expected runtime costs, selects a suitable compute resource, prepares optimized kernel code for the operation on the selected device, and starts execution as soon as its dependencies are satisfied. In this model, scheduling itself becomes part of the parallelized workload.

== Syntax ==
ILNumerics implements base functionality frequently needed for application development in technical areas: N-dimensional arrays, complex numbers, linear algebra, FFT and plotting controls (2D and 3D). The array classes are fully compatible with the array features of Matlab and numpy, including internal storage order, subarray creation, expansion, and advanced indexing. Higher level functionality is provided by toolboxes for interpolation, optimization, statistics, HDF5 and machine learning. The ILNumerics DSL is embedded into .NET. Computational algorithms are formulated using any CLI language. However, only C# is officially recommended. Due to the strong type system of the .NET framework algorithms created with ILNumerics are strongly typed. This deviates from the syntax of alternatives, which are often weakly typed and therefore easier to adopt.

== Graphics ==
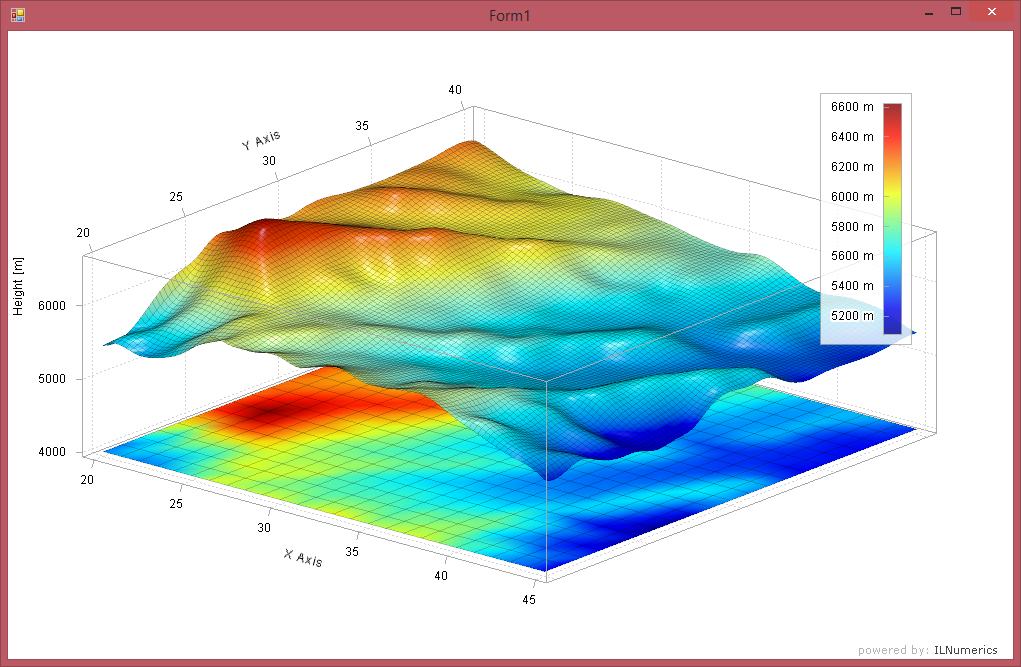
Array data is visualized as a smoothed, interpolated surface and as a heat map and both versions are combindly displayed.

A scene graph is used in ILNumerics to realize graphical output. Interactive 2D and 3D plots are used in WPF and Windows Forms applications. Hardware accelerated drawing is available via OpenGL. A fully featured software renderer is provided for legacy hardware, based on GDI+, SkiaSharp and SVG.

== IDE integration ==
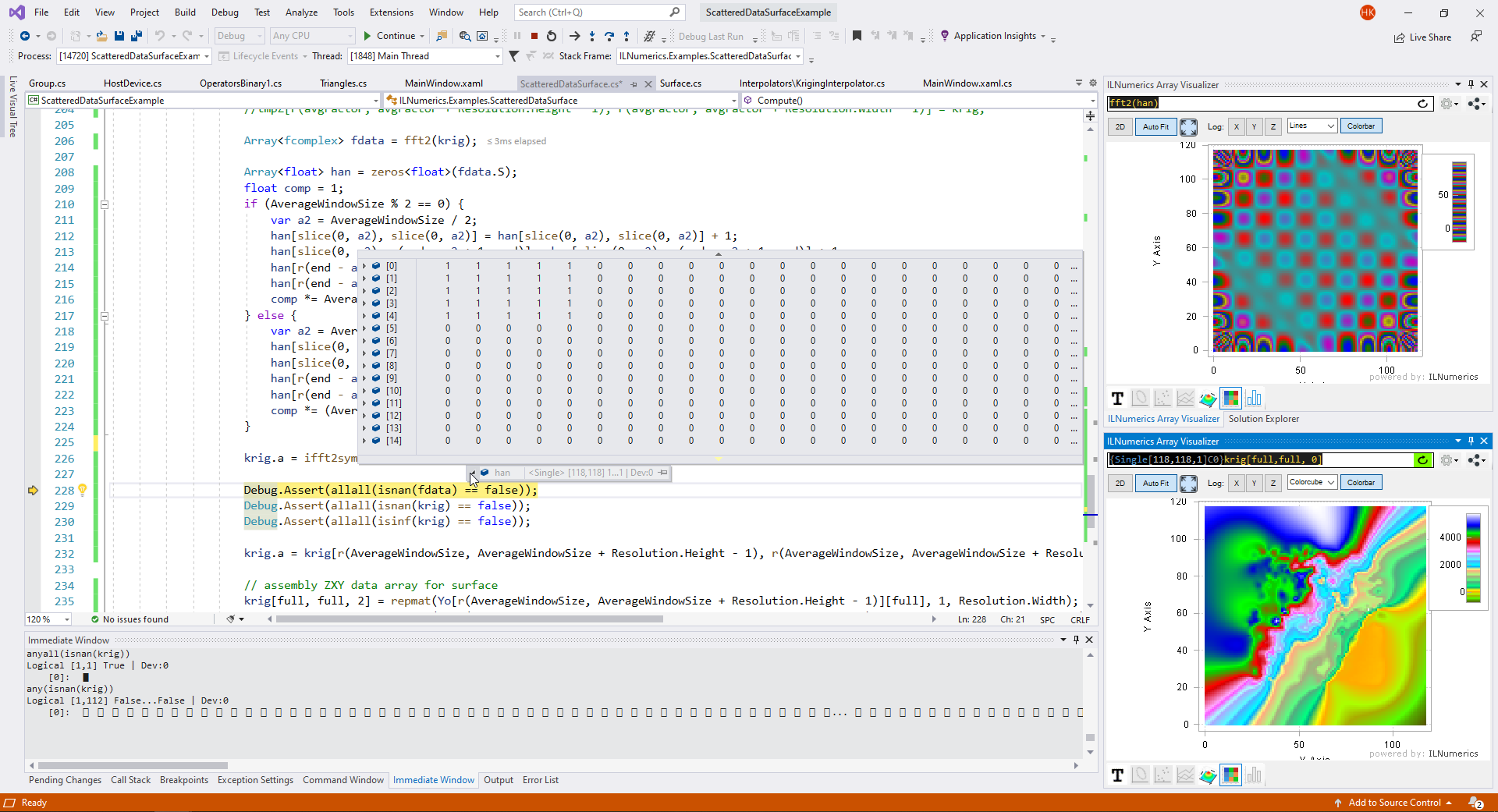
ILNumerics displays array debug data using flexible graphical options while stepping through the code.

ILNumerics integrates into Visual Studio. It adds a tool window to the IDE for the graphical inspection of mathematical objects while stepping through user code.

== Performance ==
Since ILNumerics comes as a CLI assembly, it targets Common Language Infrastructure (CLI) applications. Just like Java - those frameworks are often criticized for not being suitable for numerical computations. Reasons are the memory management by a garbage collector, the intermediate language execution and deficient optimizations by the compilers involved. ILNumerics approaches these limitations by performing loop unrolling, removal of bound checks on array accesses and cache optimizations. Further speed-up is gained by the auto-management of the memory of large array objects. Linear algebra routines rely on processor specific optimized versions of LAPACK and BLAS.

ILNumerics arrays utilize the unmanaged heap for storing data. This way, the size of ILNumerics arrays is not limited by the CLR and interoperability with 3rd party libraries is improved.

While these optimizations are suitable to bring algorithms performance on par with unmanaged languages, ILNumerics auto-parallelization adds significant advantage on a higher level of program granularity. The ability to auto-distribute whole array expressions onto parallel computing resources at runtime and the specific approach of ILNumerics in identifying parallel potential beyond simple loop bodies gains unique execution efficiency – at the same time removing optimization burden from the programmer.

== See also ==
- List of numerical-analysis software
- List of numerical libraries
