= ASP.NET Razor =

Programming syntax for ASP.NET

Razor
- Original author: Microsoft
- Developer: .NET Foundation
- Initial release: June 2010; 16 years ago
- Stable release: 3.3.0 / October 23, 2023; 2 years ago
- Preview release: 4.0.0-rc1 / November 18, 2015; 10 years ago
- Written in: C#, VB.NET, HTML
- Operating system: Microsoft Windows
- Type: Web application framework
- License: Apache License 2.0
- Website: www.asp.net/web-pages
- Repository: github.com/aspnet/Razor github.com/aspnet/AspNetWebStack github.com/dotnet/aspnetcore

Razor file formats
- Filename extension: .razor, .cshtml, .vbhtml
- Internet media type: text/html
- Developed by: Microsoft

Razor is an ASP.NET programming syntax used to create dynamic web pages with the C# or VB.NET programming languages. Razor was introduced in June 2010 and was released for Microsoft Visual Studio 2010 in January 2011. Razor is a simple-syntax view engine and was released as part of MVC 3 and the WebMatrix tool set.

Razor became a component of AspNetWebStack and then became a part of ASP.NET Core.

== Design ==
The Razor syntax is a template markup syntax, based on the C# programming language, that enables the programmer to use an HTML construction workflow. Instead of using the ASP.NET Web Forms (.aspx) markup syntax with <%= %> symbols to indicate code blocks, Razor syntax starts code blocks with an @ character and does not require explicit closing of the code-block.

The idea behind Razor is to provide an optimized syntax for HTML generation using a code-focused templating approach, with minimal transition between HTML and code. The design reduces the number of characters and keystrokes, and enables a more fluid coding workflow by not requiring explicitly denoted server blocks within the HTML code. Other advantages that have been noted:

- Supports IntelliSense – statement completion support
- Supports "layouts" – an alternative to the "master page" concept in classic Web Forms (.aspx)
- Unit testable

== See also ==
- Blazor
