= Meta.Numerics =

- Stable release: 4.1.4 / 22 Aug 2020
- Written in: C#
- Operating system: .NET Framework
- Type: Numerical library
- License: Microsoft Public License
- Website: www.meta-numerics.net

Meta.Numerics is an open-source library for advanced scientific computing on the .NET platform. It provides an object-oriented API supporting advanced functions, matrix algebra, statistics, optimization, and other numerical algorithms.

== History ==
Version 1.0 was released in April 2009. The current version 4.1.4 was released in August 2020. It has been used in academic research and software development. It is listed in the software index of the Digital Library of Mathematical Functions.

== See also ==
- List of open-source mathematical libraries
