= Area under the curve (pharmacokinetics) =

Integral of drug concentration in blood plasma over time

In the field of pharmacokinetics, the area under the curve (AUC) is the definite integral of the concentration of a drug in blood plasma as a function of time (this can be done using liquid chromatography–mass spectrometry). In practice, the drug concentration is measured at certain discrete points in time and the trapezoidal rule is used to estimate AUC. In pharmacology, the area under the plot of plasma concentration of a drug versus time after dosage (called "area under the curve" or AUC) gives insight into the extent of exposure to a drug and its clearance rate from the body.

== Interpretation and usefulness of AUC values ==
The AUC (from zero to infinity) represents the total drug exposure across time. AUC is a useful metric when trying to determine whether two formulations of the same dose (for example a capsule and a tablet) result in equal amounts of tissue or plasma exposure. Another use is in the therapeutic drug monitoring of drugs with a narrow therapeutic index. For example, gentamicin is an antibiotic that can be nephrotoxic (kidney damaging) and ototoxic (hearing damaging); measurement of gentamicin through concentrations in a patient's plasma and calculation of the AUC is used to guide the dosage of this drug.

AUC becomes useful for knowing the average concentration over a time interval, AUC/t. Also, AUC is referenced when talking about elimination. The amount eliminated by the body (mass) = clearance (volume/time) * AUC (mass*time/volume).

== AUC and bioavailability ==
In pharmacokinetics, bioavailability generally refers to the fraction of a drug that is absorbed systemically and is thus available to produce a biological effect. This is often measured by quantifying the "AUC". In order to determine the respective AUCs, the serum concentration vs. time plots are typically gathered using C-14 labelled drugs and AMS (accelerated mass spectrometry).

Bioavailability can be measured in terms of "absolute bioavailability" or "relative bioavailability".

=== Absolute bioavailability ===
Absolute bioavailability refers to the bioavailability of a drug when administered via an extravascular dosage form (i.e. oral tablet, suppository, subcutaneous, etc.) compared with the bioavailability of the same drug administered intravenously (IV). This is done by comparing the AUC of the non-intravenous dosage form with the AUC for the drug administered intravenously. This fraction is normalized by multiplying by each dosage form's respective dose.

$$F_{\text{abs}} = \left( \frac{\text{AUC}_{\text{non-IV}}}{\text{AUC}_{\text{ IV}}}\ \right) \times \left( \frac{\text{Dose}_{\text{ IV}}}{\text{Dose}_{\text{non-IV}}}\ \right)$$

=== Relative bioavailability ===
Relative bioavailability compares the bioavailability between two different dosage forms. Again, the relative AUCs are used to make this comparison and relative doses are used to normalize the calculation.

$$F_{\text{rel}} = \left( \frac{\text{AUC}_{\text{dosageA}}}{\text{AUC}_{\text{dosageB}}}\ \right) \times \left( \frac{\text{Dose}_{\text{B}}}{\text{Dose}_{\text{A}}}\ \right)$$

== Other applications ==
AUC of glucose concentration change following food intake is used to calculate the glycemic index.

== Variations ==
=== Methodology ===
The use of trapezoidal rule in AUC calculation was known in literature by no later than 1975, in J.G. Wagner's Fundamentals of Clinical Pharmacokinetics. A 1977 article compares the "classical" trapezoidal method to a number of methods that take into account the typical shape of the concentration plot, caused by first-order kinetics.

Notwithstanding the above knowledge, a 1994 Diabetes Care article by Mary M. Tai entitled "A Mathematical Model for the Determination of Total Area Under Glucose Tolerance and Other Metabolic Curves" purports to have independently discovered the trapezoidal rule. In Tai's response to the later letters to the editors, she explained that the rule was new to her colleagues, who relied on grid-counting. Tai's paper has been discussed as a case of scholarly peer review failure.

Despite the number of mathematically superior numerical integration schemes (such as those outlined in Wagner & Ayres 1977), the trapezoidal rule remains the convention for AUC calculation. Later focus on improving the accuracy of AUC calculation shifted from improving the method to improving the sampling scheme. An example is a 2019 algorithm known as OTTER: it performs a fit onto sum of exponentials curve for the input data but only uses it to suggest better sample times by finding more highly sloped periods.

=== Extensions ===
The area under the effect curve (AUEC) is an integral of the effect of a drug over time, estimated as a previously-established function of concentration. It was proposed to be used instead of AUC in animal-to-human dose translation, as computer simulation shows that it could cope better with half-life and dosing schedule variations than AUC. This is an example of a PK/PD model, which combines pharmacokinetics and pharmacodynamics.

== See also ==
- C_{max} (pharmacology)
- C_{mean} (pharmacology)
- "Area Under Curve" of the Receiver operating characteristic
