= Simpson's rules =

See:

- Simpson's rule, a method of numerical integration
- Simpson's rules (ship stability)
- Simpson–Kramer method
