= Bode's rule =

Bode's rule can refer to:

- Titius–Bode law, also known as Bode's law, a prediction on the distance between planets within a solar system in astronomy.
- Boole's rule, a method of numerical integration in mathematics. It was incorrectly written as "Bode's rule" in the 1972 printing of Abramowitz and Stegun's Handbook of Mathematical Functions with Formulas, Graphs, and Mathematical Tables, and this error was replicated elsewhere.
