= Romberg's method =

Numerical integration method

In numerical analysis, Romberg's method is used to estimate the definite integral
$$\int_a^b f(x) \, dx$$
by applying Richardson extrapolation repeatedly on the trapezium rule or the rectangle rule (midpoint rule). The estimates generate a triangular array. Romberg's method is a Newton–Cotes formula – it evaluates the integrand at equally spaced points. The integrand must have continuous derivatives, though fairly good results may be obtained if only a few derivatives exist. If it is possible to evaluate the integrand at unequally spaced points, then other methods such as Gaussian quadrature and Clenshaw–Curtis quadrature are generally more accurate.

The method is named after Werner Romberg, who published the method in 1955.

== Method ==
Using $h_n = \frac{(b-a)}{2^{n+1}}$, the method can be inductively defined by
$$\begin{align}
R(0,0) &= h_0 (f(a) + f(b)) \\
R(n,0) &= \tfrac{1}{2} R(n{-}1,\,0) + 2h_n \sum_{k=1}^{2^{n-1}} f(a + (2k-1)h_{n-1}) \\
R(n,m) &= R(n,\,m{-}1) + \tfrac{1}{4^m-1} (R(n,\,m{-}1) - R(n{-}1,\,m{-}1)) \\
&= \frac{1}{4^m-1} ( 4^m R(n,\,m{-}1) - R(n{-}1,\, m{-}1))
\end{align}$$
where $n \ge m$ and $m \ge 1 \,$. Observe that the first two equations correspond to the first column, and these are the formulas associated to the compound trapezoidal rule. In big O notation, the error for R(n, m) is: $O{\left(h_n^{2m+2}\right)}.$

The zeroth extrapolation, R(n, 0), is equivalent to the trapezoidal rule with 2^{n} + 1 points; the first extrapolation, R(n, 1), is equivalent to Simpson's rule with 2^{n} + 1 points. The second extrapolation, R(n, 2), is equivalent to Boole's rule with 2^{n} + 1 points. The further extrapolations differ from Newton-Cotes formulas. In particular further Romberg extrapolations expand on Boole's rule in very slight ways, modifying weights into ratios similar as in Boole's rule. In contrast, further Newton-Cotes methods produce increasingly differing weights, eventually leading to large positive and negative weights. This is indicative of how large degree interpolating polynomial Newton-Cotes methods fail to converge for many integrals, while Romberg integration is more stable.

By labelling our $O(h^2)$ approximations as $A_0\big(\frac{h}{2^n}\big)$ instead of $R(n,0)$, we can perform Richardson extrapolation with the error formula defined below:
$$\int_a^b f(x) \, dx = A_0\bigg(\frac{h}{2^n}\bigg)+a_0\bigg(\frac{h}{2^n}\bigg)^{2} + a_1\bigg(\frac{h}{2^n}\bigg)^{4} + a_2\bigg(\frac{h}{2^n}\bigg)^{6} + \cdots$$
Once we have obtained our $O(h^{2(m+1)})$ approximations $A_m\big(\frac{h}{2^n}\big)$, we can label them as $R(n,m)$.

When function evaluations are expensive, it may be preferable to replace the polynomial interpolation of Richardson with the rational interpolation proposed by Bulirsch & Stoer (1967).

== A geometric example ==
To estimate the area under a curve the trapezoid rule is applied first to one-piece, then two, then four, and so on.

One-piece. Note since it starts and ends at zero, this approximation yields zero area.

Two-piece

Four-piece

Eight-piece

After trapezoid rule estimates are obtained, Richardson extrapolation is applied.

- For the first iteration the two piece and one piece estimates are used in the formula (4 × (more accurate) − (less accurate))/3. The same formula is then used to compare the four piece and the two piece estimate, and likewise for the higher estimates
- For the second iteration the values of the first iteration are used in the formula (16 × (more accurate) − (less accurate))/15
- The third iteration uses the next power of 4: (64 × (more accurate) − (less accurate))/63 on the values derived by the second iteration.
- The pattern is continued until there is one estimate.

Number of pieces	Trapezoid estimates	First iteration	Second iteration	Third iteration
		(4 MA − LA)/3	(16 MA − LA)/15	(64 MA − LA)/63
1	0	(4×16 − 0)/3 = 21.333...	(16×34.667 − 21.333)/15 = 35.556...	(64×42.489 − 35.556)/63 = 42.599...
2	16	(4×30 − 16)/3 = 34.666...	(16×42 − 34.667)/15 = 42.489...	
4	30	(4×39 − 30)/3 = 42		
8	39			

== Example ==
As an example, the Gaussian function is integrated from 0 to 1, i.e. the error function erf(1) ≈ 0.842700792949715. The triangular array is calculated row by row and calculation is terminated if the two last entries in the last row differ less than 10^{−8}.

0.77174333
0.82526296  0.84310283
0.83836778  0.84273605  0.84271160
0.84161922  0.84270304  0.84270083  0.84270066
0.84243051  0.84270093  0.84270079  0.84270079  0.84270079

The result in the lower right corner of the triangular array is accurate to the digits shown. It is remarkable that this result is derived from the less accurate approximations obtained by the trapezium rule in the first column of the triangular array.

== Implementation ==
Here is an example of a computer implementation of the Romberg method (in the C programming language):

#include <stdio.h>
#include <math.h>

void print_row(size_t i, double *R) {
  printf("R[%2zu] = ", i);
  for (size_t j = 0; j <= i; ++j) {
    printf("%f ", R[j]);
  }
  printf("\n");
}

/*
INPUT:
(*f) : pointer to the function to be integrated
a    : lower limit
b    : upper limit
max_steps: maximum steps of the procedure
acc  : desired accuracy

OUTPUT:
Rp[max_steps-1]: approximate value of the integral of the function f for x in [a,b] with accuracy 'acc' and steps 'max_steps'.
*/
double romberg(double (*f)(double), double a, double b, size_t max_steps, double acc) 
{
  double R1[max_steps], R2[max_steps]; // buffers
  double *Rp = &R1[0], *Rc = &R2[0]; // Rp is previous row, Rc is current row
  double h = b-a; //step size
  Rp[0] = (f(a) + f(b))*h*0.5; // first trapezoidal step

  print_row(0, Rp);

  for (size_t i = 1; i < max_steps; ++i) {
    h /= 2.;
    double c = 0;
    size_t ep = 1 << (i-1); //2^(n-1)
    for (size_t j = 1; j <= ep; ++j) {
      c += f(a + (2*j-1) * h);
    }
    Rc[0] = h*c + .5*Rp[0]; // R(i,0)

    for (size_t j = 1; j <= i; ++j) {
      double n_k = pow(4, j);
      Rc[j] = (n_k*Rc[j-1] - Rp[j-1]) / (n_k-1); // compute R(i,j)
    }

    // Print ith row of R, R[i,i] is the best estimate so far
    print_row(i, Rc);

    if (i > 1 && fabs(Rp[i-1]-Rc[i]) < acc) {
      return Rc[i];
    }

    // swap Rn and Rc as we only need the last row
    double *rt = Rp;
    Rp = Rc;
    Rc = rt;
  }
  return Rp[max_steps-1]; // return our best guess
}

Here is an implementation of the Romberg method (in the Python programming language):

import numpy as np
from math import erf, sqrt, pi

def print_row(row):
    # Print one row of the Romberg table in a fixed-width numeric format.
    # This makes the convergence pattern easy to read column by column.
    print(" ".join(f"{x:11.8f}" for x in row))

def romberg(f, a, b, eps=1e-8, max_iter=20):
    """
    Approximate the definite integral of f from a to b using Romberg integration.

    Parameters
    ----------
    f : callable
        Function to integrate. It should ideally accept NumPy arrays so that
        evaluations at many points can be vectorized.
    a, b : float
        Lower and upper limits of integration.
    eps : float, optional
        Desired stopping tolerance. The algorithm stops when two successive
        diagonal Romberg estimates are close enough.
    max_iter : int, optional
        Maximum number of refinement levels allowed.

    Returns
    -------
    float
        The best Romberg estimate of the integral.
    """

    # R[n, m] will hold the nth refinement and the mth Richardson extrapolation.
    R = np.zeros((max_iter+1, max_iter+1))

    # Base case: trapezoidal rule using only the endpoints a and b.
    # This is the first and coarsest approximation to the integral.
    R[0, 0] = (b - a)*(f(a) + f(b))/2

    # Print the first row, which contains only the initial trapezoidal estimate.
    print_row(R[0, :1])

    # Refine the approximation level by level.
    # Each new level halves the step size and adds the function values at the
    # new midpoints introduced by subdivision.
    for n in range(1, max_iter+1):
        # Step size at refinement level n.
        # Since the interval is split into 2^n subintervals, the mesh width is:
        h_n1 = (b - a)/(2**n)   # h_{n-1}

        # Generate the new points introduced at this refinement level.
        # These are the odd multiples of h relative to a:
        # a + h, a + 3h, a + 5h, ..., a + (2^n - 1)h
        #
        # There are 2^(n-1) such points, and NumPy generates them efficiently.
        x = a + h_n1*np.arange(1, 2**n, 2)

        # Update the trapezoidal estimate using the recursive Romberg relation:.
        R[n, 0] =  R[n-1, 0]/2 + h_n1*np.sum(f(x))

        # Richardson extrapolation:
        for m in range(1, n+1):
            R[n, m] = R[n, m-1] + (R[n, m-1] - R[n-1, m-1])/(4**m - 1)

        # Print the completed row up to the current diagonal element.
        print_row(R[n, :n+1])

        # Stopping criterion:
        # If the last two diagonal-related values are sufficiently close,
        # we accept the most recent extrapolated estimate.
        if abs(R[n, n] - R[n, n-1]) < eps:
            return R[n, n]

    # If the method does not converge within max_iter levels, raise an error.
    raise RuntimeError("Romberg method did not converge within max_iter.")

# Example usage:
# Integrate the function corresponding to erf(1):
#   erf(1) = 2/sqrt(pi) * integral_0^1 exp(-t^2) dt
#
f = lambda t: 2/np.sqrt(np.pi) * np.exp(-t*t)

# Compute and print the result.
print("Approximation =", romberg(f, 0.0, 1.0))
print("Exact value   =", erf(1.0))
