= Werner Romberg =

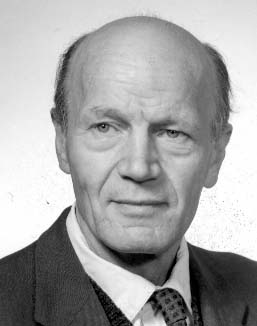
- Born: 16 May 1909; Berlin, German Empire
- Died: 5 February 2003 (aged 93); Heidelberg, Federal Republic of Germany
- Education: Ludwig-Maximilians-Universität München
- Known for: Romberg's method
- Scientific career
- Fields: Mathematics; Physics
- Workplaces: University of Oslo; Technical University of Trondheim; Heidelberg University
- Doctoral advisor: Arnold Sommerfeld

Werner Romberg (born 16 May 1909 in Berlin; died 5 February 2003 in Heidelberg) was a German mathematician and physicist.

Romberg studied mathematics and physics from 1928 at Heidelberg University and the Ludwig-Maximilians-Universität München and completed his doctorate in 1933 at the Ludwig-Maximilians-Universität München under the supervision of Arnold Sommerfeld; his thesis was entitled "Zur Polarisation des Kanalstrahllichtes" ["On the polarisation of channel light beams"]. At the Ludwig-Maximilians-Universität München, he studied mathematics under, among others, Oskar Perron and Constantin Carathéodory. In 1933, as a so-called "half-Jew" in the terminology of the new National Socialist government of Germany, he sought to immigrate to the Soviet Union. From 1934 to 1937, he worked as a theoretical physicist in the university of Dnipro (then Dnipropetrovsk). In 1938, he went, via the Institute for Astrophysics in Prague, to Norway, where he became an assistant to Egil Hylleraas at the University of Oslo. He also briefly worked at the Technical University of Trondheim with Johan Holtsmark, who was building a Van de Graaff generator there. With the German occupation of Norway he fled to Uppsala in Sweden. In 1941 the Nazi German state stripped him of his German citizenship, and in 1943 recognition of his doctorate was revoked. He became a Norwegian citizen in 1947.

After the Second World War, from 1949 to 1968, he was a professor in Trondheim; from 1960 he was head of the applied mathematics department. In Norway, he built up his research group in numerical analysis, and part of the introduction of digital computers, such as GIER, the first computer at Trondheim. From 1968 he held the chair for Mathematical Methods in Natural Sciences and Numerics at Heidelberg University.

== See also ==
- Romberg's method
