= Cavg =

Average concentration of a drug in circulation during a dosing interval

C_{avg} is the average concentration of a drug in the central circulation during a dosing interval in steady state. It is calculated by

$$C_{\text{avg}}=\frac{AUC_{\tau,\text{ss}}}{\tau}$$

where $AUC_{\tau,\text{ss}}$ is the area under the curve and $\tau$ the dosing interval.

== See also ==
- Area under the curve (pharmacokinetics)
- C_{max} (pharmacology)
