= Darboux's formula =

Summation formula

In mathematical analysis, Darboux's formula is a formula introduced by Gaston Darboux (1876) for summing infinite series by using integrals or evaluating integrals using infinite series. It is a generalization to the complex plane of the Euler–Maclaurin summation formula, which is used for similar purposes and derived in a similar manner (by repeated integration by parts of a particular choice of integrand). Darboux's formula can also be used to derive the Taylor series from calculus.

== Statement ==
If φ(t) is a polynomial of degree n and f an analytic function then

$$\begin{align}
& \sum_{m=0}^n (-1)^m (z - a)^m \left[\varphi^{(n - m)}(1)f^{(m)}(z) - \varphi^{(n - m)}(0)f^{(m)}(a)\right] \\
= {} & (-1)^n(z - a)^{n + 1}\int_0^1\varphi(t)f^{(n+1)}\left[a + t(z - a)\right]\, dt.
\end{align}$$

The formula can be proved by repeated integration by parts.

== Special cases ==
Taking φ to be a Bernoulli polynomial in Darboux's formula gives the Euler–Maclaurin summation formula. Taking φ to be (t − 1)^{n} gives the formula for a Taylor series.
