= Boole's rule =

Method of numerical integration

Boole's rule is a method of numerical quadrature arising in calculus, and named after George Boole. Boole's rule and the composite Boole rule approximate the area under a curve over a fixed interval using 5 equally spaced points, and is designed to exactly integrate 5th-order polynomials over that interval. It is a member of the Newton–Cotes family of rules.

== Formula ==
=== Simple Boole's rule ===
It approximates an integral
$$\int_{a}^{b} f(x)\,dx$$
by using the values of f at five equally spaced points:
$$\begin{align}
x_0 &= a, \\
x_1 &= x_0 + h, \\
x_2 &= x_0 + 2h, \\
x_3 &= x_0 + 3h, \\
x_4 &= x_0 + 4h = b.
\end{align}$$

It is expressed thus in Abramowitz and Stegun's Handbook of Mathematical Functions with Formulas, Graphs, and Mathematical Tables:
$$\int_{x_0}^{x_4} f(x)\,dx = \frac{2h}{45}\bigl[ 7f(x_0) + 32 f(x_1) + 12 f(x_2) + 32 f(x_3) + 7f(x_4)\bigr] -\frac{8f^{(6)}(\xi)h^7}{945}$$
for some number $\xi$ between $x_0$ and $x_4$, and 945 = 1 × 3 × 5 × 7 × 9. It is sometimes erroneously referred to as Bode's rule, due to a typographical error that propagated from Abramowitz and Stegun.

The following constitutes a very simple implementation of the method in Common Lisp which ignores the error term:

Example implementation in Common Lisp

(defun integrate-booles-rule (f x1 x5)
  "Calculates the Boole's rule numerical integral of the function F in
   the closed interval extending from inclusive X1 to inclusive X5
   without error term inclusion."
  (declare (type (function (real) real) f))
  (declare (type real                   x1 x5))
  (let ((h (/ (- x5 x1) 4)))
    (declare (type real h))
    (let* ((x2 (+ x1 h))
           (x3 (+ x2 h))
           (x4 (+ x3 h)))
      (declare (type real x2 x3 x4))
      (* (/ (* 2 h) 45)
         (+ (*  7 (funcall f x1))
            (* 32 (funcall f x2))
            (* 12 (funcall f x3))
            (* 32 (funcall f x4))
            (*  7 (funcall f x5)))))))

=== Composite Boole's rule ===
In cases where the integration is permitted to extend over equidistant sections of the interval $[a, b]$, the composite Boole's rule might be applied. Given $N$ divisions, where $N$ mod $4 = 0$, the integrated value amounts to
$$\int_{x_0}^{x_N} f(x)\,dx = \frac{2h}{45}
\left[7\big(f(x_0) + f(x_N)\big)
+ 32 \sum_{i \in \{1, 3,  5, \ldots, N - 1\}} f(x_i)
+ 12 \sum_{i \in \{2, 6, 10, \ldots, N - 2\}} f(x_i)
+ 14 \sum_{i \in \{4, 8, 12, \ldots, N - 4\}} f(x_i)
\right] + \text{error term},$$
where the error term is similar to above. The following Common Lisp code implements the aforementioned formula:

Example implementation in Common Lisp

(defun integrate-composite-booles-rule (f a b n)
  "Calculates the composite Boole's rule numerical integral of the
   function F in the closed interval extending from inclusive A to
   inclusive B across N subintervals."
  (declare (type (function (real) real) f))
  (declare (type real                   a b))
  (declare (type (integer 1 *)          n))
  (let ((h (/ (- b a) n)))
    (declare (type real h))
    (flet ((f[i] (i)
            (declare (type (integer 0 *) i))
            (let ((xi (+ a (* i h))))
              (declare (type real xi))
              (the real (funcall f xi)))))
      (* (/ (* 2 h) 45)
         (+ (*  7 (+ (f[i] 0) (f[i] n)))
            (* 32 (loop for i from 1 to (- n 1) by 2 sum (f[i] i)))
            (* 12 (loop for i from 2 to (- n 2) by 4 sum (f[i] i)))
            (* 14 (loop for i from 4 to (- n 4) by 4 sum (f[i] i))))))))

Example implementation in R

booleQuad <- function(fx, dx) {
  # Calculates the composite Boole's rule numerical 
  # integral for a function with a vector of precomputed
  # values fx evaluated at the points in vector dx.
  n <- length(dx)
  h <- diff(dx)
  stopifnot(exprs = {
    length(fx) == n
    n > 8L
    h[1L] >= 0
    n >= 2L
    n %% 4L == 1L
    isTRUE(all.equal(h, rep(h[1L], length(h))))
  })
  nm2 <- n - 2L
  cf <- double(nm2)
  cf[seq.int(1, nm2, 2L)] <- 32
  cf[seq.int(2, nm2, 4L)] <- 12
  cf[seq.int(4, nm2, 4L)] <- 14
  cf <- c(7, cf, 7)
  sum(cf * fx) * 2 * h[1L] / 45
}

== See also ==
- Newton–Cotes formulas
- Simpson's rule
- Romberg's method
