= Simpson's rules (ship stability) =

Rules used in ship stability and naval architecture

Simpson's rules are a set of rules used in ship stability and naval architecture, to calculate the areas and volumes of irregular figures. This is an application of Simpson's rule for finding the values of an integral, here interpreted as the area under a curve.

Simpson's First Rule

== Simpson's 1st rule ==
Also known as the 1–4–1 rule (after the multipliers used ).

$$\text{Area} = \frac{h}{3}( a + 4b + c).$$

== Simpson's 2nd rule ==
Simpson's Second Rule

Also known as the 1–3–3–1 rule, Simpson's second rule is a simplified version of Simpson's 3/8 rule.

$$\text{Area} = \frac{3h} 8 (a + 3b + 3c + 9d).$$

== Simpson's 3rd rule ==
Also known as the 5–8–1 rule, SImpson's third rule is used to find the area between two consecutive ordinates when three consecutive ordinates are known.

$$\text{Area} = \frac h {12} (5a + 8b - c ).$$

This estimates the area in the left half of the figure for Simpson's 1st Rule while using all three pieces of data.

== Use of Simpsons rules ==
Simpson's rules are used to calculate the volume of lifeboats, and by surveyors to calculate the volume of sludge in a ship's oil tanks. For instance, in the latter, Simpson's 3rd rule is used to find the volume between two co-ordinates. To calculate the entire area / volume, Simpson's first rule is used.

Simpson's rules are used by a ship's officers to check that the area under the ship's GZ curve complies with IMO stability criteria.
