= Tai's model =

Rediscovery of the trapezoidal rule in 1994

An animation showing how the trapezoidal rule approximation improves with more divisions.

In 1994, nutrition scholar Mary M. Tai published a paper in the journal Diabetes Care entitled "A Mathematical Model for the Determination of Total Area Under Glucose Tolerance and Other Metabolic Curves". In the paper, Tai proposes "Tai's model" as a method of estimating the area under a curve by dividing the area into simple polygons and summing their totals. Apparently unbeknownst to Tai, and not noted by peer reviewers or the journal's editors, her method is in fact the trapezoidal rule, a basic method of calculus used by Babylonian astronomers before 50 BCE and later independently by English and French astronomers in the 14th century.

Several scholars replied to the paper in letters to the journal, objecting to the naming of "Tai's model" and the treatment of a method "used in undergraduate calculus courses" as a novel discovery in the field of diabetes care. A letter entitled "Tai's Formula is the Trapezoidal Rule" pointed out errors in Tai's representation of the underlying mathematics (such as referring to a count of square units below the curve as the "true value" of the area, against which to measure the accuracy of Tai's model) and problems with the method's applicability to glucose tolerance curves, which are already approximations.

Tai responded, saying that she had derived the method independently during a session with her statistical advisor in 1981, and noting that "the concept behind it is obviously common sense". She explained that she submitted her method for publication at the request of her colleagues at the Obesity Research Center, who had already been using it in their own work under the name "Tai's formula" and wanted to cite a formal source. Tai argues that her contribution "presented the original concept into a functioning mathematical description that can be easily observed and applied". Mathematicians Stephan Garcia and Steven Miller retort that "every calculus book in existence presents the trapezoidal rule in a manner that can easily be applied!"

Tai's 1994 paper has been cited over 500 times as of March 2025. The episode has been cited as an illustration of the slower-than-expected spread of knowledge in certain contexts. Garcia and Miller call it a cautionary tale in verifying the originality of one's work before publishing it. Author Ben Orlin cautions against contemptuous judgment of someone trying to share what they had learned, and criticizes academic publishing's focus on credit and lack of venues for small contributions.
