= Gaal =

Gaal may refer to:

== People ==
- Gaal (biblical figure)
- Béla Gaál (1893–1945), Hungarian film director
- Franciska Gaal (1904–1973), Hungarian actress
- Gaszton Gaál (1868–1932), Hungarian landowner, ornithologist and politician
- István Gaál (1933–2007), Hungarian film director
- Lisl Gaal (1924–2024), Austrian-born American mathematician, married to Steven
- Miklos Gaál (born 1974), Finnish photographer
- Miklós Gaál (born 1981), Hungarian footballer
- Pieter Gaal (1769/70–1819), Dutch painter
- Sándor Gaál (1885–1972), Hungarian physicist
- Steven Gaal (1924–2016), Hungarian–American mathematician, married to Lisl
- Tom Gaal (born 2001), German footballer

=== Fictional people ===
- Gaal Dornick, fictional character in Isaac Asimov's Foundation series
- Guy Gaal and Rada Gaal, siblings in Prisoners of Power, 1969 Russian science fiction novel by Strugatsky Brothers.

== Places ==
- Gaal, Styria, Austria
- Gaal (state constituency), Kelantan, Malaysia

== See also ==
- Van Gaal
- Gaahl
