= Van Gaal (disambiguation) =

Van Gaal may refer to:

== Surname ==
- Annemarie van Gaal (born 1962), Dutch businesswoman and author
- Gebke van Gaal (born 1962), Dutch politician
- Louis van Gaal (born 1951), Dutch football player and coach

== See also ==
- (14616) Van Gaal, minor planets
- Gaal
- Van Galen
