= List of public domain projects =

This is a list of public domain projects of software, algorithms, video games, and other digital works that are freely available for use, modification, and distribution without copyright restrictions.

== Public domain projects ==
=== Compression ===
- Compressed file library
- LZ77 and LZ78
- XZ Utils

=== Cryptography ===
- Advanced Encryption Standard
- BLAKE3
- EdDSA
- Fowler–Noll–Vo hash function
- ISAAC (cipher)
- Poly1305
- Rabbit (cipher)
- Salsa20
- SHA-1
- SHA-2
- SHA-3
- SipHash
- Skein (hash function)
- X25519

=== Games ===
- Abuse (video game)
- Android Nim
- Arcade Volleyball
- Ballerburg
- BASIC Computer Games
- Cart Life
- The Castle Doctrine
- C-evo
- Colossal Cave Adventure
- Coming Out Simulator 2014
- Diamond Trust of London
- Dragonfire (video game)
- Eamon (video game)
- Gloom (video game)
- Golgotha (video game)
- Hamurabi (video game)
- Hunt the Wumpus
- IPPOLIT
- Kiki the nano bot
- The Last Eichhof
- Lemonade Stand
- Miles Sound System
- Mugwump (video game)
- One Hour One Life
- Passage (video game)
- Santa Paravia en Fiumaccio
- Sea Dragon (video game)
- Spacewar!
- Speed Haste
- Star Trader
- Star Trek (1971 video game)
- Stunt Copter
- Trek73

=== Internet, Protocols, and Communication ===
- ASCII
- CERN httpd
- TCP/IP
- Qmail
- Ucspi-tcp
- We the People (petitioning system)
- World Wide Web

=== Numerical / Scientific Software ===
- ADMS
- Basic Linear Algebra Subprograms
- Dataplot
- EPANET
- FFTPACK
- GeoTIFF
- Gridded Surface/Subsurface Hydrologic Analysis
- JAMA (numerical linear algebra library)
- LS-DYNA
- Mersenne Twister
- PubChem
- SLATEC
- SPICE
- Template Numerical Toolkit
- X-13ARIMA-SEATS

=== Programming languages / Libraries ===
- BDS C
- Berkeley Yacc
- CMU Common Lisp
- CLIPS
- Expect
- LaTeXML
- Lemon (parser generator)
- MPICH
- MUMPS
- Netlib
- Otter (theorem prover)
- PForth
- SLIME
- SQLite
- Steel Bank Common Lisp
- TeX

=== Text Editors / Utilities ===
- Citadel (software)
- Climm
- CSPro
- Daemontools
- Dbndns
- Djbdns
- Epi Map
- Erwise
- Ezmlm
- Foremost (software)
- HDOS
- Hemlock (text editor)
- High Orbit Ion Cannon
- ImageJ
- Md5deep
- Merlin (assembler)
- Page Interchange Language
- Pdf-parser
- TempleOS
- Toybox
- Turbo Vision
- Youtube-dl

== See also ==
- Comparison of free and open-source software licenses
- Creative Commons licenses and List of free-content licenses
- Copyright status of works by the federal government of the United States
- Copyleft
- List of free and open-source software packages
- List of open-source hardware projects
- Public Domain Day
- Public domain in the United States
- Public-domain software
- Category:Public domain art
- Public domain music

=== Public domain licenses ===
Creative Commons Public Domain Mark

CC0 license logo

Unlicense logo

WTFPL license logo

- 0BSD — Zero-Clause Berkeley Software Distribution license
- Creative Commons Zero — CCØ
- Do What the Fuck You Want to Public License — WTFPL
- Unlicense
