= Netlib =

Software repository

Netlib is a repository of software for scientific computing maintained by AT&T, Bell Laboratories, the University of Tennessee and Oak Ridge National Laboratory. Netlib comprises many separate programs and libraries. Most of the code is written in C and Fortran, with some programs in other languages.

== History ==
The project began with email distribution on UUCP, ARPANET and CSNET in the 1980s.

The code base of Netlib was written at a time when computer software was not yet considered merchandise. Therefore, no license terms or terms of use are stated for many programs. Before the Berne Convention Implementation Act of 1988 (and the earlier Copyright Act of 1976) works without an explicit copyright notice were public-domain software. Also, most of the Netlib code is work of US government employees and therefore in the public domain. While several packages therefore don't have explicit waiver/anti-copyright statements, for instance, the SLATEC package has an explicit statement.

== Contents ==
Some well-known packages maintained in Netlib are:

- AMPL Solver Library (ASL)
- Basic Linear Algebra Subprograms (BLAS)
- EISPACK
- FDLIBM, the freely-distributable libm, which forms the basis of many other C mathematical library implementations
- LAPACK
- LINPACK
- MINPACK
- QUADPACK

The SLATEC package is special in that it comprises a number of other packages like BLAS and LINPACK.

== Other projects ==
- GNU Scientific Library (GSL), written in C and distributed under the GNU General Public License

== See also ==
- List of public domain projects
