= Jean Dhombres =

French mathematician

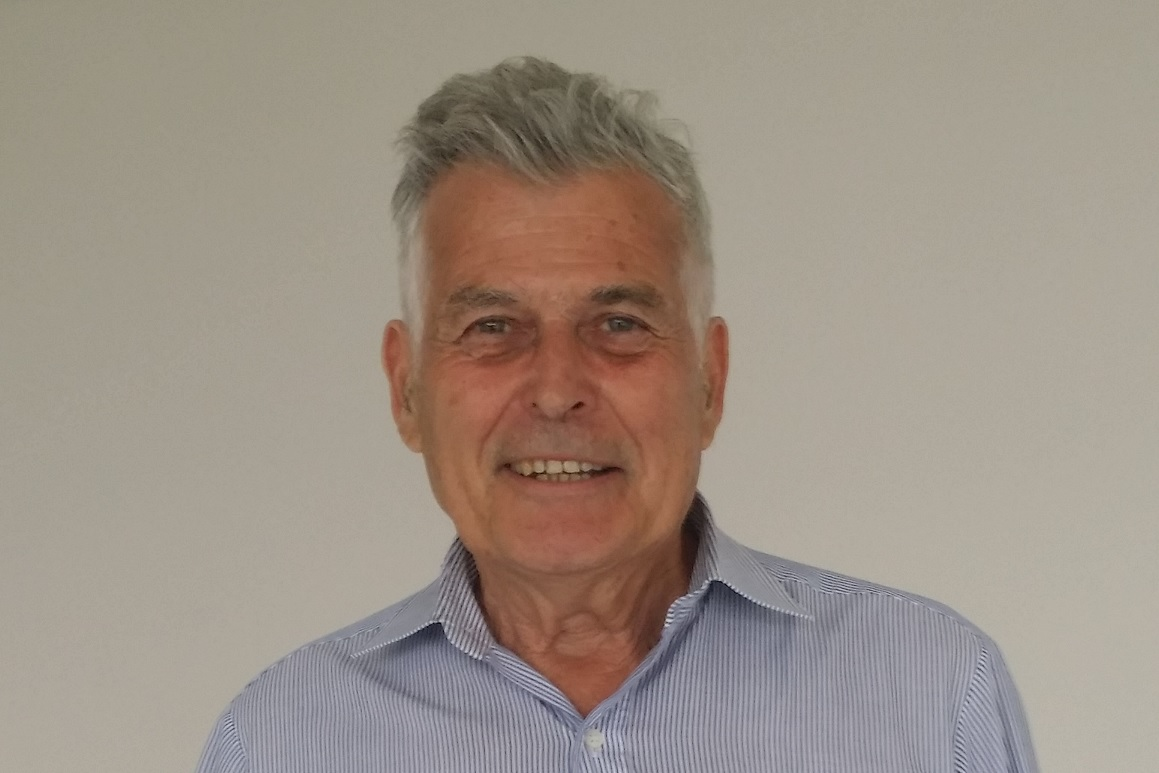
- Jean Dhombres in June 2017
- Born: August 27, 1942 (age 84); Paris
- Education: École Polytechnique; Pierre and Marie Curie University
- Awards: Chevalier de l'ordre national du mérite (1978); Prix de l'Académie des sciences (1999); Prix Roberval (2000)
- Scientific career
- Fields: Mathematics; History of science
- Thesis: Sur les opérateurs multiplicativement liés (1970)

Jean Guy Dhombres (born 27 August 1942 in Paris) is a French mathematician, historian of mathematics and the mathematical sciences, and biographer of Lazare Carnot.

== Biography ==
Dhombres graduated from the École Polytechnique in the class of 1962. He received in 1970 his doctorate in mathematics from Pierre and Marie Curie University (Paris 6), which is now part of Sorbonne University. He was from 1964 to 1971 a maître de conférences at the École nationale supérieure d'ingénieurs de constructions aéronautiques (ENSICA now part of ISAE-SUPAERO) and from 1965 to 1972 an attaché de recherche en mathématiques at CNRS. At the University of Nantes he was from 1972 to 1978 a maître assistant and from 1980 to 1988 a professor; from 1972 to 1974 he also taught at the École nationale des ponts et chaussées. In the 1970s and early 1980s he held visiting professorships at Bangkok's Asian Institute of Technology in 1971–1972, at the University of Singapore in 1973, at the University of Waterloo in 1975, at the University of Ottawa in 1976–1979, and at the University of Wuhan in 1980–1981. During his years in Ottawa he was also scientific advisor to the French Embassy in Canada.

At the University of Nantes, Dhombres was director of the Centre François Viète d'histoire et philosophie des sciences et des techniques from 1985 (when it was created) until 1995. He was director of studies in the history of exact science at the EHESS from 1988 until his retirement. Since 1998 he has held visiting professorships at Technische Universität Berlin in 1998, at the University of California, Berkeley in 1999, at the University of Geneva in 1999–2000, and at the University of Mexico in 2002–2003 and again in 2008. He was in 2004 a visiting member of the U.S. National Gallery of Art's Center for Advanced Study in the Visual Arts.

Dhombres was from 1983 to 1987 the president of the Société française d'histoire des sciences. He was the directing editor of the book series Un savant, une époque for the publishing house Belin éditeur in Paris. He was the founding editor of the journal Sciences et Techniques en Perspective distributed by Librairie Blanchard and has been a member of the editorial boards of several journals, including Historia Mathematica and Physis.

His mathematical research focuses on functional analysis. He has written extensively on many parts of the history of mathematics. Among his other honors, he was made doctor honoris causa by the University of Geneva in 1997.

He is married with two children and four grandchildren.

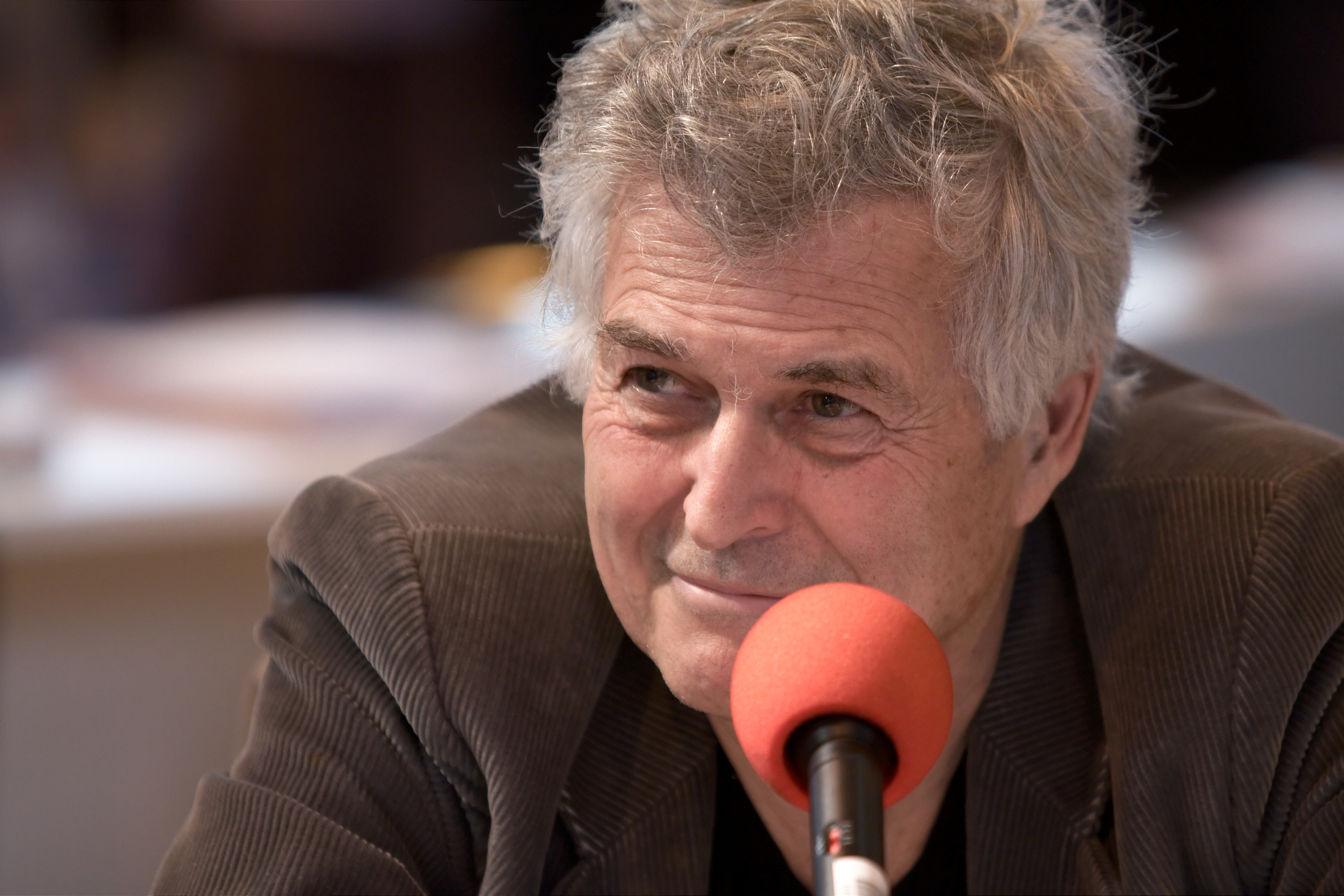
Jean Dhombres au Salon du livre de Paris 2010.

== Selected publications ==
- Dhombres, J. G. (1975). "A functional characterization of Markovian linear exaves". Bulletin of the American Mathematical Society. 81 (4): 703–706. doi:10.1090/S0002-9904-1975-13828-6.
- Dhombres, J. (1978). Nombre, mesure et continu : épistémologie et histoire. Paris: Cedic/Nathan.
- Dhombres, Jean G. (1984). "French textbooks in the sciences 1750–1850". History of Education. 13 (2): 153–161. doi:10.1080/0046760840130205.
- Dhombres, Jean (1988). "Relations de dépendance entre les équations fonctionnelles de Cauchy". Aequationes Mathematicae. 35 (2–3): 186–212. doi:10.1007/BF01830943. S2CID 117808782.
- Aczél, J.; Dhombres, J. (6 April 1989). Functional Equations in Several Variables. ISBN 9780521352765.
- Dhombres, Nicole; Dhombres, J. (1989). Naissance d'un pouvoir, sciences et savants en France (1793-1824). Payot. ISBN 2228881074.
- Dhombres, J.; Dhombres, N. (1997). Lazare Carnot. Fayard. ISBN 978-2213025797; in French; 770 pages
- Dhombres, Jean (2000). "Scientific Motivation for and mood from the Experience of the Egyptian Expedition". Science, Technology and Industry in the Ottoman World. De Diversis Artibus. Vol. 46. pp. 91–99. doi:10.1484/M.DDA-EB.4.00946. ISBN 978-2-503-51095-8. 2000
- Massey, Lyle, ed. (2003). "Shadows of a circle, or what is there to be seen? Some figurative discourses in the mathematical sciences during the seventeenth century by J. Dhombres". The Treatise on Perspective. Yale University Press. ISBN 978-0300097566.
- Tuilier, André, ed. (2006). "La mise à jour des mathématiques par les professeurs royaux by J. Dhombres". Histoire du Collège de France - La création 1530-1560. Fayard. ISBN 978-2213627335.
- Dhombres, Jean (2007). "René Taton et les questions posées par l'histoire professionnelle des sciences". Archives Internationales d'Histoire des Sciences. 57 (159): 363–382. doi:10.1484/J.ARIHS.5.101428.
- Dhombres, J. (2000). "Les mathématiques dans l'enseignement obligatoire" (PDF). Repères IREM (38): 11–13.
- Dhombres, J. (2004). "Pierre Laffitte, professeur de mathématiques". Sciences et Techniques en Perspective. II^{e} série. 8 (2): 79–138. (See Pierre Laffitte.)
- Dhombres, J. (2007). "L'infinitésimal chez Euler". Tangente: 56–67.
- Alvarez, Carlos; Dhombres, J. (2011). Une histoire de l'imaginaire mathématique: Vers le théorème fondamental de l'algèbre et sa démonstration par Laplace en 1795. Hermann. ISBN 978-2705681920.
- Dhombres, J.; Alvarez, C. (2012). Pierre Simon de Laplace, 1749-1827: Le parcours d'un savant. Hermann. ISBN 978-2705682736; 326 pp.
- Dhombres, J.; Alvarez, C. (2013). Les savoirs mathématiques et leurs pratiques culturelles: De l'émancipation de l'Âge baroque à la moisson des Lumières (1585-1750). Hermann. ISBN 978-2705683788.
- Dhombers, J.; Alvarez, C. (2013). Une histoire de l'invention mathématique : les démonstrations du théorème fondamental de l'algèbre dans le cadre de l'analyse réelle et de l'analyse complexe de Gauss à Liouville. ISBN 978-2-7056-8317-7.
- Dhombres, J.; Régnier-Roux, Daniel (2017). La Bibliotheca Mathematica du XVII^{e} siècle en Europe. Premier Volume. Analyse. Paris: Librairie Blanchard; 297 pp.
- Dhombres, J.; Régnier-Roux, Daniel (2017). La Bibliotheca Mathematica du XVII^{e} siècle en Europe. Deuxuème Volume. Documents. Paris: Librairie Blanchard; 369 pp.
