= Leopold Weiss =

Leopold Weiss may refer to:

- Muhammad Asad (1900–1992), Islamic writer and diplomat born Leopold Weiss
- Sylvius Leopold Weiss (1687–1750), German lutenist and composer
- Lipót Fejér 1880–1959), Hungarian mathematician born Leopold Weisz
