= Ákos Császár =

Hungarian mathematician

Ákos Császár (Hungarian: Császár Ákos, Hungarian pronunciation: [ˈtʃasaɾ]) (26 February 1924 – 14 December 2017) was a Hungarian mathematician, specializing in general topology and real analysis. He discovered the Császár polyhedron, a nonconvex polyhedron without diagonals. He introduced the notion of syntopogeneous spaces, a generalization of topological spaces.

He was born in Budapest. Towards the end of 1944 his grandfather lost his life during the Siege of Budapest. Then his father, older brother and himself were arrested by the Germans and sent to a concentration camp approximatively 45 miles east of Budapest. An infectious illness spread in the camp, and his brother and father died, but Ákos survived.

He was a member of the group of five students of the late professor Lipót Fejér, who called them "The Big Five". The other four are John Horvath, János Aczél, Steven Gaal, and László Fuchs, all of whom became mathematics professors in North America; of that group, only Császár became a university professor in Budapest.

Between 1952 and 1992 he was head of the Department of Analysis at the Eötvös Loránd University in Budapest. He was elected corresponding member (1970), and then full member (1979) of the Hungarian Academy of Sciences. He was general secretary (1966–1980), president (1980–1990), and honorary president (after 1990) of the János Bolyai Mathematical Society. He received the Kossuth Prize (1963) and the Gold Medal of the Hungarian Academy of Sciences (2009). Császár died in Budapest on 14 December 2017, aged 93.

== Selected publications ==
- Á. Császár: A polyhedron without diagonals, Acta Scientiarum Mathematicarum, 13 (1949), 140–142.
- Á. Császár: Foundations of general topology, Pergamon Press, The Macmillan Co., New York 1963 xix+380 pp., translated from Fondements de la topology générale, Akadémiai Kiadó, Budapest (1960) 231 pp.
- Á. Császár: General topology, Translated from the Hungarian by Klára Császár. Adam Hilger Ltd., Bristol, 1978. 488 pp. ISBN 0-85274-275-4
