= QAG =

QAG may refer to:

- QAG, general-purpose routine in the QUADPACK FORTRAN 77 library for numerical integration of one-dimensional functions
- Qualification Approval Guide, a procedural document used in the qualification and approval of flight simulators
- Queensland Art Gallery, an art museum located in South Bank, Brisbane, Queensland, Australia
