= John Horvath (mathematician) =

Hungarian-American mathematician

John Michael Horvath (born János Horváth; 30 July 1924 – 12 March 2015) was a Hungarian-American mathematician. He is noted for his contributions to analysis, especially in functional analysis and distribution theory.

== Early life ==
Horvath was born János Horváth on 30 July 1924 in Budapest.

== Education and career ==
Horvath received his doctorate in 1947 from the University of Budapest as a student of Lipót Fejér and Frigyes Riesz. Four other talented mathematicians also graduated in the class of 1947: János Aczél, Ákos Császár, László Fuchs and István Gál. Together with Horvath, they were referred to as the Big Five.

After obtaining his doctorate, he went to the French National Centre for Scientific Research (CNRS) to do research. At the recommendation of John von Neumann and Salomon Lefschetz, in 1951 he came to the newly founded University of Los Andes in Bogotá, where he became the first head of the mathematics department and established modern mathematics in Colombia. At his invitation, Laurent Schwartz and Jean Dieudonné visited the university. His later work on analytic continuations and a general definition of the Convolution of distributions spread the ideas of Schwartz's theory of distributions. In 1957 Horvath finally went to the United States, where he taught at the University of Maryland until 1994 and was then awarded the title of Professor Emeritus.

It was Schwartz, who recommended him to write elementary textbook on distribution theory. MathSciNet called his book Topological Vector Spaces and Distributions (1966), "The most readable introduction to the theory of vector spaces available in English and possibly any other language." In 2006, Horvath edited and wrote one of the chapters (Holomorphic Functions) for A Panorama of Hungarian Mathematics in the Twentieth Century.

He was an American Mathematical Society since 1958. In 1997, he received an honorary doctorate of the Universidad de los Andes. And in 1998, he became a member of the Hungarian Academy of Sciences, in 2001 he was elected to the Colombian Academy of Sciences.

== Works ==
- (1966) Topological Vector Spaces and Distributions Addison-Wesley, Reading, Massachusetts. ISBN 0201029855 Horvath, John (January 2012). 2013 Dover reprint. Courier Corporation. ISBN 978-0-486-48850-9.
- (2005) A Panorama of Hungarian Mathematics in the Twentieth Century Springer-Verlag Berlin Heidelberg. ISBN 978-3-540-28945-6
