= Casa Editrice Leo S. Olschki =

Italian publishing house

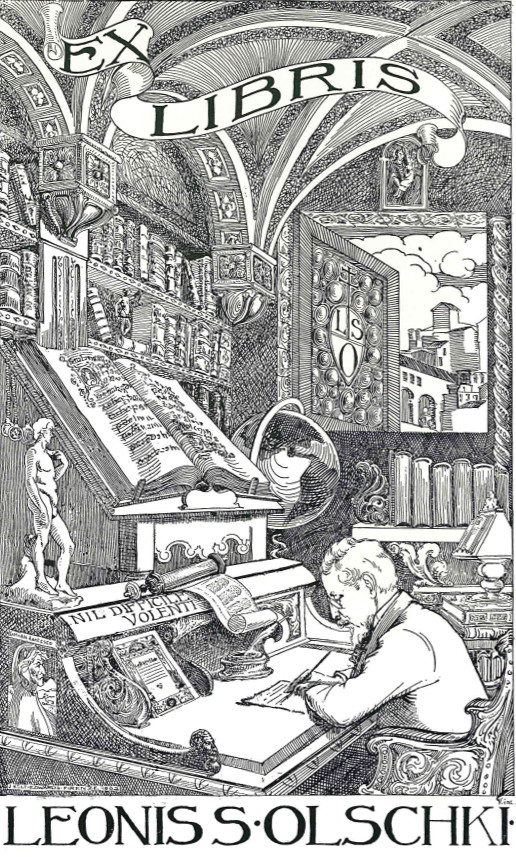
- Ex libris of the founder
- Status: Active
- Founded: 1886
- Founder: Leo S. Olschki
- Country of origin: Italy
- Headquarters location: Viuzzo del Pozzetto, 8 IT-50126, Firenze
- Key people: Olschki family; Leo S. Olschki (founder); Aldo & Cesare Olschki; Alessandro Olschki; Daniele Olschki (CEO, 2011-...); Costanza Olschki
- Nonfiction topics: Humanities
- Official website: www.olschki.it

Casa Editrice Leo S. Olschki is a publishing house of Florence, Tuscany, Italy. It was founded in Verona in 1886 by Leo Samuele Olschki and is among the country's oldest publishers of critical work in the humanities.

== History ==
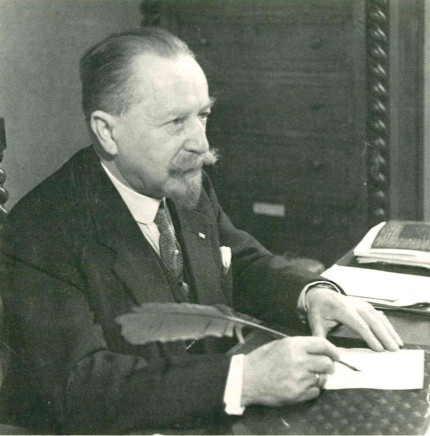
Portrait of founder Leo Olschki (1861-1940)

Leo S. Olschki came from a family of typographers of Jewish ancestry. Born in nowadays Poland (then part of Prussia), he moved to Berlin in 1879 and to Verona in 1883, where he became manager of the publishing house Libreria Antiquaria Münster and punlished his first catalogue of incunables. The firm moved to Venice in 1890 and to Florence in 1897, where it is still based today.

In 1909, Olschki bought his own typography and called it "Giuntina", as a tribute to the Giunti family of Florentine printers. In 1914 the publishing house opened an office in Rome, which remained active until the WWII.

With the Great War, Olschki was forced to leave Italy and hide in Switzerland, as he didn't have Italian citizenship. He founded the publishing house Salso (acronym of Societé Anonyme Leo S. Olschki), based in Geneva. In 1920 he returned to Italy, and died in Switzerland in 1940.

In 1939, the Italian fascist regime promoted racial laws which ruled Jew people out of society, including publishing, and Olschki was forced to remove their logo from books. The publishing house also sold the Giuntina typography.

After WWII, Leo's sons Aldo and Cesare Olschki continued the family firm and expanded its market over the Italian borders. In 1963 Aldo Olschki died and was succeeded by his son Alessandro. Since 2011 the firm is run by Alessandro's sons Daniele and Costanza.

Olschki's managerial style of keeping the highest possible number of books in catalogue brought the firm to offer 2,000 available titles in the 1966 catalogue. However, the flood of the Arno of that year invaded the warehouse in via Ghibellina and destroyed over 200 tons of books.

In 1985 the firm bought a XVI-century villa and moved their offices there. The current catalogue includes over 4,000 books and 25 scientific journals, including "Archivio storico italiano", Italy's oldest journal still in service.

== See also ==
- Books in Italy
- Physis (journal)
