= SLATEC =

SLATEC Common Mathematical Library is a FORTRAN 77 library of over 1,400 general purpose mathematical and statistical routines. The code was developed at US government research laboratories and is therefore public domain software.

"SLATEC" is an acronym for the Sandia, Los Alamos, Air Force Weapons Laboratory Technical Exchange Committee, an organization formed in 1974 to foster the exchange of technical information between the computer centers of three US government laboratories.

== Project history and current status ==
In 1977, the SLATEC Common Mathematical Library (CML) Subcommittee decided to construct a library of FORTRAN subprograms to provide portable, non-proprietary, mathematical software that could be used on a variety of computers, including supercomputers, at the three sites. The computers centers of the Lawrence Livermore National Laboratory, the National Bureau of Standards and the Oak Ridge National Laboratory also participated from 1980–81 onwards.

The main repository for SLATEC is Netlib. The current version is 4.1 (July 1993). Since then, a very small number of minor corrections has been made without incrementing the version number.

The GNU Scientific Library (GSL), initiated in 1996 and stable since 2001, was started with the explicit aim to provide a more modern replacement for SLATEC.

== Contents ==
Each subroutine in SLATEC is tagged as belonging to one of 13 subpackages. Some of these subpackages are also well known as free-standing FORTRAN subprogram libraries, including BLAS, EISPACK, FFTPACK, LINPACK and QUADPACK. The following table shows all subpackages and the number of subroutines they contain:

subpackage	number of routines	separately available in Netlib	purpose
BLAS	114	yes	basic linear algebra
DASSL	16	no	solve differential/algebraic equation systems
DEPAC	10	no	solve ordinary differential equations (Runge–Kutta methods and similar)
EISPACK	71	yes	eigenvalues and eigenvectors
FFTPACK	48	yes	fast Fourier transform
FISHPACK	19	yes	use cyclic reduction to directly solve second- and fourth-order finite difference approximations to separable elliptic Partial Differential Equations in various coordinate systems
FNLIB	161	yes, as 'FN'	special functions
LINPACK	128	yes	linear algebra, outdated
PCHIP	41	no	piecewise cubic Hermite interpolation
QUADPACK	59	yes	numerical integration of one-dimensional functions
SDRIVE	36	no	solve ordinary differential equations
SLAP	124	yes	sparse linear algebra package
XERROR	17	no	error handling

== See also ==
- List of open-source mathematical libraries
