= Paying public domain =

La Propriété littéraire sous le régime du domaine public payant (1862)

Paying public domain (French: Domaine public payant, Spanish: dominio público pagante) is a copyright regime where copies, presentations or performances of a work that has entered the public domain are still subject to royalties, which are payable to the state or to an authors' association. The principle is that revenue from the work of long-dead artists should be used to support creativity of living artists.

It may apply only to certain types of work, such as folklore or traditional cultural expressions. However, communities that wish to control their traditional knowledge or cultural expressions may perceive the royalties as an unwelcome tax. Paying public domain regimes have been introduced and withdrawn in several countries. They are still in place in several countries in South America and Africa.

== Origins ==
Victor Hugo, who also played an important role in developing the Berne Convention, was one of the earlier supporters of the concept of domaine public payant, under which a nominal fee would be charged for copying or performing works in the public domain, and this would go into a common fund dedicated to helping artists, especially young people. There was no post-mortem protection of works, but a period of exploitation that started from the date of publication and could expire during the author's lifetime.

== Definition ==
A 1949 UNESCO report said that the normal sense of the term was that "after the expiration of the normal period of protection, that is, when the work falls into the public domain, the work cannot be freely used, as it could in the case of normal free public domain. Instead, the user must pay a royalty, generally to the authors' societies, who utilize such funds for cultural purposes or to aid needy authors or their families. In some cases, the state also participates in such fees." A 2010 WIPO report said that under these regimes "a fee is imposed for the use of works in the public domain. Generally, the system works like a compulsory license: the use is conditioned on payment of the prescribed fee but not upon the securing of a prior authorization."

Fees payable to the state and/or the authors' society vary from country to country. The user must pay the fee, but does not have to obtain prior authorization. The fee may only be applicable to commercial exploitation of the material. It usually applies only to works that have entered the public domain because their copyright has expired, but in some countries it applies to expressions of folklore. Usually the fees are used to fund young or struggling creators, or to promote creative works, but in Algeria they are used to preserve the public domain itself. The cost of administration may absorb much of the money, but if the fees are too high they may discourage use of public domain materials.

The concept has been proposed as a way to protect traditional cultural expressions, but may not be suitable for communities more interested in control over traditional knowledge and traditional cultural expressions than in compensation. It might be difficult to establish the true owners and the types of work to which it would apply, and it could be seen simply as a form of taxation.

== Countries ==
The 1949 UNESCO report said there were only five countries that had laws that adopted this system: Uruguay (since 1937), Bulgaria (since 1939), Italy (since 1941), Romania (since 1946) and Yugoslavia (since 1946). The report thought that some form of domaine public payant might also apply in Russia. In Bulgaria, Uruguay and Yugoslavia, the rule applied to any sort of public domain work. In Italy it was limited to presentation of works intended for public showing and musical works, and to books. In Romania it applied to publication and representation of literary and dramatic works. In Bulgaria the duration lasted for 20 years after the work entered the public domain, but in the other countries it was perpetual.

In the past Brazil (1973–1983), Italy (1882–1925 and 1941–1996), France (1956–1976) and Mexico (1963–1993) had paying public domain regimes, but have since abolished them. A 1984 article listed Argentina, Italy, Mexico and the USSR among the countries that had adopted some form of the system. A 2017 article noted that in Argentina and Uruguay a fee was payable to the state for almost every use of works in the public domain, whether or not for commercial purposes, including reproduction, publication, performance and broadcasting.

The 2010 WIPO report noted the paying public domain was still in force in Algeria, Kenya, Rwanda, Senegal, Republic of the Congo, Côte d'Ivoire, and Paraguay. It explained that the Bangui Agreement of the OAPI (Organisation Africaine de la Propriété Intellectuelle) and its Annex on literary and artistic property provided for such a regime for exploitation of expressions of folklore and works or productions that have fallen into the public domain. A similar system, called "Community Intellectual Rights", has been proposed in Latin America, inspired in part by Peru's Law No. 27811. The concept is that "traditional knowledge should stay in the public domain for anyone to use, but originators should share in the benefits when it is used for commercial purposes. Furthermore, these rights should not be subject to time limits.

There have been proposals to introduce a domaine public payant system across Europe, but as of 2001 the idea had not gained much support. The German Writers Union has proposed a modern version on the grounds that droit de suite and domaine public payant should be linked, since droit de suite usually benefits the distant heirs of dead artists rather than being used to encourage living artists. A proposal discussed and rejected for the 1993 Copyright Duration Directive was that the last 20 years of post mortem auctoris fees should be used to benefit living artists rather than the artist's heirs.

== Sample laws ==
Under Algeria's 19 July 2003 Copyrights and Related Rights Act, works of traditional cultural heritage and national works considered as public property are granted special protection [Article 8]. The National Bureau of Copyrights and Neighboring Rights protects these works [Article 139]. Their use is subject to a license from the Bureau, and if the use is profitable a royalty is payable to the Bureau [Article 140].

Burundi Act 1/021 2005 Article 25 says:

- Works in the public domain shall be placed under the protection of the State, represented by the Ministry in charge of culture.
- The public representation or performance or the direct or indirect fixation of works in the public domain and of works exclusively composed of elements borrowed from works that have fallen into the public domain, with a view to exploitation for profit, are subject to regulations on royalties under conditions that shall be determined by an order of the Ministry in charge of culture.
- The revenue from the collection of royalties for the use of works in the public domain shall be devoted to social and cultural purposes.

Cape Verde Decree-Law No. 1/2009 of April 27, 2009 says "The use and exploitation, for financial gain, of works in the public domain shall be free as long as such use is subordinate to absolute respect for the moral rights, on the previous authorization of the member of Government responsible for culture and the payment of a fee to be set by the members of Government responsible for culture and finance, with the purpose of promotion and cultural development and social assistance to Cape Verdean authors."

== Sources ==
- Act No. 1/021 of December 30, 2005, on the Protection of Copyright and Related Rights in Burundi (PDF), Burundi, 2005 – via WIPO
- Algeria (19 July 2003), Copyrights and Related Rights Act (PDF) – via WIPO
- Busch, Anna Friederike (2015-05-19), Protection of Traditional Cultural Expressions in Latin America: A Legal and Anthropological Study, Springer, ISBN 978-3-662-46770-1
- Cape Verde (27 April 2009), Cape Verde Decree-Law No. 1/2009 of April 27, 2009, on the Revision of Copyright Law (PDF), Cape Verde
- Jomunsi, Neil (2018), "Domaine public payant : non merci", page42.org, ISSN 2428-7911, archived from the original on 2018-11-28
- Marzetti, Maximiliano (2017), Paying for Works in The Public Domain? An Analysis of the Argentinian Dominio Publico Pagante
- Mouchet, Carlos (1983–1984), "Problems of the "Domaine Public Payant"", 8 Colum.-VLA Art & L. 137, 8, WIPO: 137
- Stokes, Simon (2001), Art and Copyright, Hart Publishing, ISBN 978-1-84113-225-9
- UNESCO (27 May 1949), Domain Public Payant (PDF), Paris
- WIPO Secretariat (24 November 2010), Note on the Meanings of the Term "Public Domain" in the Intellectual Property System with special reference to the Protection of Traditional Knowledge and Traditional Cultural Expressions/Expressions of Folklore, Intergovernmental Committee on Intellectual Property and Genetic Resources, Traditional Knowledge and Folklore: Seventeenth Session
