= Van Galen =

Van Galen is a Dutch toponymic surname. One town of origin is "Galen", now Gahlen, a village 25 km from the Dutch border in the district of Wesel in Germany. The Galen family finds its origin there as well. Other families, particularly the variants Van Gaalen and Van Gaal, originated in the hamlet of Gaal near Schaijk, North Brabant. People with the surname include:

- Barry van Galen (born 1970), Dutch football midfielder
- Berend van Galen (1606–1678), Dutch and local name of the Prince-bishop of Münster
- Johan van Galen (1604–1653), Dutch Navy Commodore
- Robin van Galen (born 1972), Dutch water polo player and coach

Variant spellings

- Alexander van Gaelen (1670–1728), Dutch battle and hunting scenes painter
- Chad VanGaalen (born 1977), Canadian singer-songwriter and illustrator
- Kenny van Gaalen (born 1988), Dutch sidecarcross rider

== See also ==
- HNLMS Van Galen, five ships of the Royal Netherlands Navy named after Johan van Galen
- Louis van Gaal (born 1951), Dutch football player and coach
