= Van Gaal =

Van Gaal is a Dutch surname, where 'van' is a tussenvoegsel (surname prefix) meaning "from". Notable people with the surname include:

- Annemarie van Gaal (born 1962), Dutch entrepreneur, investor, author, and television personality
- Gebke van Gaal (born 1973), Dutch politician
- Louis van Gaal (born 1951), Dutch football player and manager
- Taja Vovk van Gaal (born 1980), Slovenian cultural historian and creative director at the House of European History

== See also ==
- Gaal
- 14616 Van Gaal, minor planet
