= Mark Galassi =

American scientist

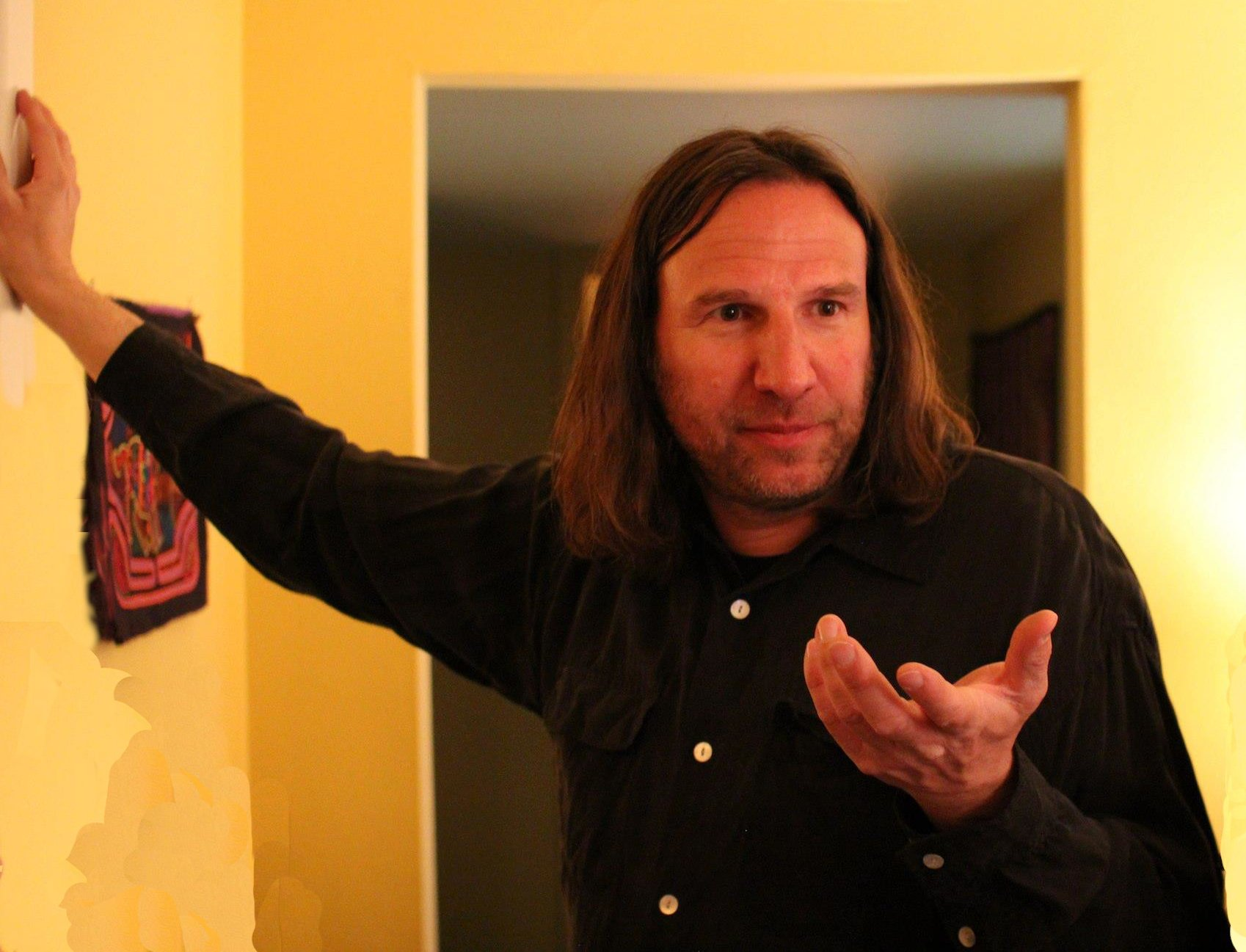
- Born: 1965-01-08 (age 61); Manhattan, New York
- Education: Reed College; Stony Brook University
- Occupation: Scientist
- Known for: GNU Scientific Library • Gamma-ray bursts • Institute for Computing in Research
- Awards: Los Alamos medal for community relations (inaugural, 2021); Ten Who Made a Difference in Santa Fe
- Scientific career
- Fields: Astrophysics, Computer Science
- Workplaces: Tektronix, Virtual Corporation, Los Alamos Laboratory
- Thesis: Lattice Geometrodynamics (1992)
- Doctoral advisor: Martin Rocek
- Website: www.galassi.org/mark/

Mark Galassi is a physicist, computer scientist, and contributor to the free and open-source software movement. He was born in Manhattan, grew up in France and Italy, and lives in Santa Fe, New Mexico.

== Education ==
Galassi studied at the Liceo Classico Giuseppe Parini, graduating in 1983.

He completed his BA in physics at Reed College in 1986. He has credited various aspects of the college for launching his career, including learning to write software from fellow student Keith Packard and others who taught informal classes in the Reed College Paideia classes.

He then completed his Ph.D. in physics in 1992 at the Institute for Theoretical Physics at Stony Brook under Martin Roček.

== Work and research ==
Galassi works in the Space Science and Applications group at the Los Alamos National Laboratory as a research scientist.

In Los Alamos he has worked in:

- Gamma-ray bursts: High Energy Transient Explorer and HETE-2 satellites, the Raptor telescope suite, the Swift satellite.
- Muon tomography: Cosmic-ray muon tomography to detect high-Z materials.
- Nuclear nonproliferation: Scientific methods to address the spread of nuclear materials and weapons.
- Machine learning: The Genie feature extraction system.

In the 1980s he also worked for Tektronix on the 11000 series oscilloscope, Cygnus Solutions (now part of Red Hat) working on Guile and eCos.

== Free/open-source contributions ==
Galassi has been involved in the free and open-source software movement since 1984. He designed the GNU Scientific Library together with James Theiler. He was also an early contributor to GNOME, and designed and led development of the Dominion world simulation game.

He has served on the board of directors of the Software Freedom Conservancy from its inception until the present time. He also was chair of the board until 2022.

== Educational initiatives ==
Galassi has been training students since the 1980s, teaching them in research methods, with emphasis on using only free/open-source software tools.

After decades of developing this pipeline, in 2019, he conceived of and co-founded the Institute for Computing in Research, a non-profit which trains high school students to do research, deeply rooted in free/open-source software. The Institute, founded in Santa Fe, New Mexico in 2019, offers a research internship modeled after the Los Alamos internship program. It has since spread to Portland, Oregon in 2021 and to Austin, Texas in 2022.

In 2021 Galassi was awarded the inaugural Los Alamos medal for community relations and the Santa Fe New Mexican "Ten Who Made a Difference" award, both for the creation of the student pipeline that culminates in the Institute for Computing in Research.
