= Physis (journal) =

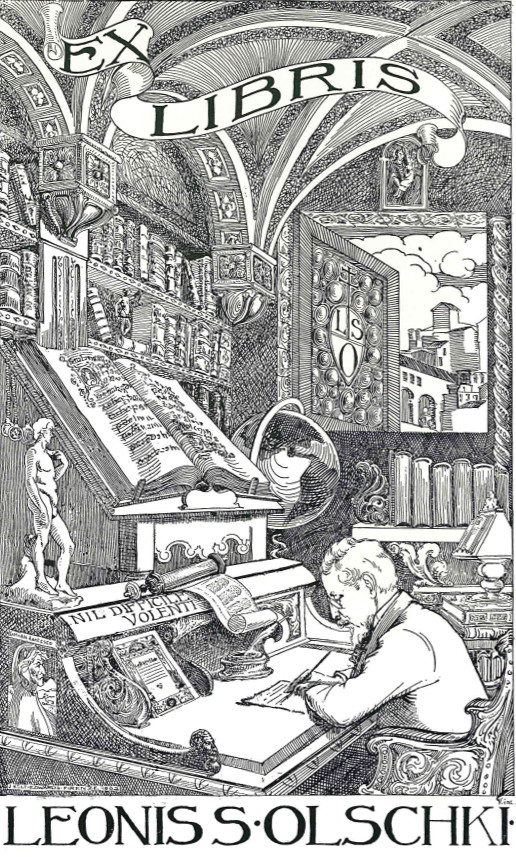
- Discipline: History of Science
- Language: English, French, German, Italian, Spanish

Publication details
- History: 1959–present
- Publisher: Leo S. Olschki Editore (Italy)
- Frequency: Biannually

Standard abbreviations
- ISO 4: Physis
- NLM: Physis Riv Int Stor Sci

Indexing
- CODEN: PYSSA3
- ISSN: 0031-9414
- OCLC no.: 801819437

Links
- Journal homepage

Physis (Italian: PHYSIS. Rivista Internazionale di Storia della Scienza) is a biannual peer-reviewed scientific journal covering the history of science from antiquity to the present day. It was established in 1959 by Leo Samuele Olschki. The journal publishes articles in Italian, English, French, German and Spanish. From 1959 till 1985 it was published quarterly (first series); since 1991 (second series) it has been published biannually.

== Abstracting and indexing ==
The journal is abstracted and indexed in:

- EBSCO databases
- Index Islamicus
- International Bibliography of Periodical Literature
- L'Année philologique
- Modern Language Association Database
- Philosopher's Index
- Scopus (selected years only)
- zbMATH Open
