= László Fuchs =

Hungarian-American mathematician (born 1924)

László Fuchs (born June 24, 1924) is a Hungarian-born American mathematician, the Evelyn and John G. Phillips Distinguished Professor Emeritus in Mathematics at Tulane University. He is known for his research and textbooks in group theory and abstract algebra.

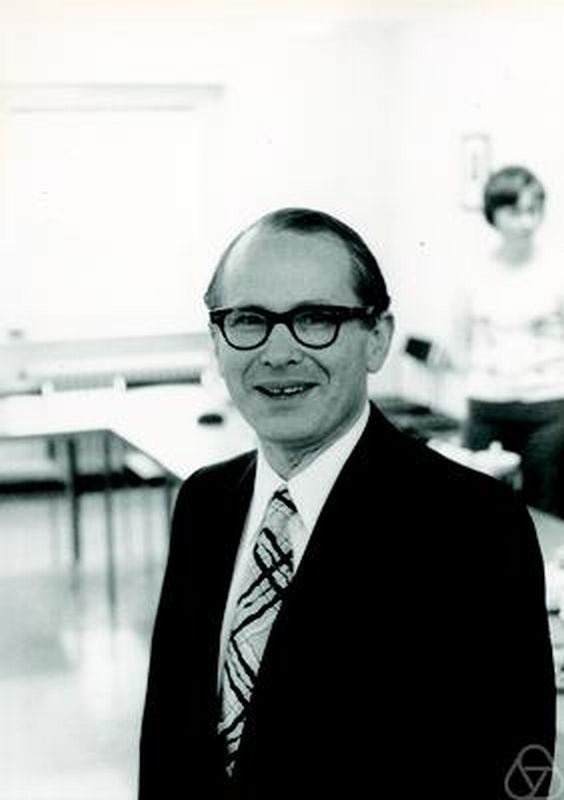
Fuchs in 1975

== Biography ==
Fuchs was born on June 24, 1924, in Budapest, into an academic family: his father was a linguist and a member of the Hungarian Academy of Sciences. He earned a bachelor's degree in 1946 and a doctorate in 1947 from Eötvös Loránd University. After teaching high school mathematics for two years, and then holding positions at Eötvös Loránd, the Mathematical Research Institute of the Hungarian Academy of Sciences, and the University of Miami, he joined the Tulane faculty in 1968. At Tulane, Fuchs chaired the mathematics department from 1977 to 1979. He retired in 2004.

In 2004, Fuchs was honored at the Hungarian Academy of Sciences 80th anniversary as one of the "big five" most distinguished Hungarian mathematicians. The other honorees were John Horvath, János Aczél, Ákos Császár and Steven Gaal. Fuchs has nearly 100 academic descendants, many of them through his student at Eötvös Loránd, George Grätzer. He was treasurer of the János Bolyai Mathematical Society from 1949 until 1963, and secretary-general of the society from 1963 to 1966.

Fuchs turned 100 on June 24, 2024.

== Books ==
- Fuchs, L. (1958), Abelian Groups, Publishing House of the Hungarian Academy of Sciences, Budapest, 367pp, MR 0106942. Reprinted by Pergamon Press, International Series of Monographs on Pure and Applied Mathematics, 1960.
- Fuchs, L. (1963), Partially ordered algebraic systems, Oxford: Pergamon Press, 229pp, MR 0171864. Translated into Russian and German.
- Fuchs, László (1970), Infinite abelian groups. Vol. I, Pure and Applied Mathematics, Vol. 36, New York: Academic Press, 290pp, MR 0255673.
- Fuchs, László (1973), Infinite abelian groups. Vol. II, New York: Academic Press, 363pp, MR 0349869.
- Fuchs, László (1980), Abelian p-Groups and Mixed Groups, Séminaire de Mathématiques Supérieures [Seminar on Higher Mathematics], vol. 70, Montreal, Que.: Presses de l'Université de Montréal, 139pp, ISBN 2-7606-0468-3, MR 0569744.
- Fuchs, László (1983), Modules over valuation domains, Vorlesungen aus dem Fachbereich Mathematik der Universität Essen [Lecture Notes in Mathematics at the University of Essen], vol. 9, Essen: Universität Essen Fachbereich Mathematik, 133pp, MR 0709258.
- Fuchs, László; Salce, Luigi (1985), Modules over valuation domains, Lecture Notes in Pure and Applied Mathematics, vol. 97, New York: Marcel Dekker Inc., 317pp, ISBN 0-8247-7326-8, MR 0786121.
- Fuchs, László; Salce, Luigi (2001), Modules over non-Noetherian domains, Mathematical Surveys and Monographs, vol. 84, Providence, RI: American Mathematical Society, 613pp, ISBN 0-8218-1963-1, MR 1794715.

== Awards and honors ==
Fuchs won the Kossuth Prize in 1953. He is a foreign member of the Hungarian Academy of Sciences. Two conferences were dedicated to him on the occasion of his 70th birthday, and another on his 75th.

At Tulane University, Fuchs held the W. R. Irby Professorship from 1979 to 1992, and the Evelyn and John G. Phillips Distinguished Professorship from then until his retirement.

In 2012 he became a fellow of the American Mathematical Society.
