= QUADPACK =

Software library for numerical integration

- Original authors: Robert Piessens; Elise deDoncker-Kapenga; Christoph W. Überhuber; David Kahaner
- Initial release: May 1981
- Stable release: 11 October 2021
- Written in: FORTRAN 77
- Type: Library
- License: Public domain
- Website: nines.cs.kuleuven.be/software/QUADPACK/

QUADPACK is a FORTRAN 77 library for numerical integration (quadrature) of one-dimensional functions. It was included in the SLATEC Common Mathematical Library and is therefore in the public domain. The individual subprograms are also available on netlib.

The GNU Scientific Library reimplemented the QUADPACK routines in C. SciPy provides a Python interface to part of QUADPACK.

== Routines ==
The main focus of QUADPACK is on automatic integration routines in which the user inputs the problem and an absolute or relative error tolerance and the routine attempts to perform the integration with an error no larger than that requested. There are nine such automatic routines in QUADPACK, in addition to a number of non-automatic routines. All but one of the automatic routines use adaptive quadrature.

Summary of naming scheme for automatic routines
Prefix, if present

D	Double precision

1st letter

Q	Quadrature

2nd letter

N	Non-adaptive
A	Adaptive

3rd letter

G	General integrand
W	Weight function of specified form

4th letter, if present

	Simple integrator
S	Singularities handled
P	Specified points of local difficulty (singularities, discontinuities …)
I	Infinite interval
O	Oscillatory weight function (cos or sin) over a finite interval
F	Fourier transform (cos or sin)
C	Cauchy principal value

suffix

	basic version
E	extended parameter choices

=== General-purpose routines ===
The two general-purpose routines most suitable for use without further analysis of the integrand are QAGS for integration over a finite interval and QAGI for integration over an infinite interval. These two routines are used in GNU Octave (the quad command) and R (the integrate function).

QAGS
uses global adaptive quadrature based on 21-point Gauss–Kronrod quadrature within each subinterval, with acceleration by Peter Wynn's epsilon algorithm.
QAGI
is the only general-purpose routine for infinite intervals, and maps the infinite interval onto the semi-open interval (0,1] using a transformation then uses the same approach as QAGS, except with 15-point rather than 21-point Gauss–Kronrod quadrature. For an integral over the whole real line, the transformation used is $x = (1-t)/t$:
$$\int_{-\infty}^{+\infty} f(x) dx = \int_0^1 {dt\over t^2} \left(f\left(\frac{1-t}{t}\right)
+ f\left(-\frac{1-t}{t}\right)\right) \;.$$
This is not the best approach for all integrands: another transformation may be appropriate, or one might prefer to break up the original interval and use QAGI only on the infinite part.

=== Brief overview of the other automatic routines ===
QNG
simple non-adaptive integrator
QAG
simple adaptive integrator
QAGP
similar to QAGS but allows user to specify locations of internal singularities, discontinuities etc.
QAWO
integral of cos(ωx) f(x) or sin(ωx) f(x) over a finite interval
QAWF
Fourier transform
QAWS
integral of w(x) f(x) from a to b, where f is smooth and w(x) = (x–a)^{α} (b–x)^{β} log^{k}(x–a) log^{l}(b–x), with k, l = 0 or 1 and α, β > –1
QAWC
Cauchy principal value of the integral of f(x)/(x–c) for user-specified c and f

== See also ==
- List of numerical libraries
- List of open-source mathematical libraries
