= FFTPACK =

- Developer: Paul N. Swarztrauber
- Initial release: April 1985
- Written in: Fortran
- Type: Numerical software
- License: public domain
- Website: www.netlib.org/fftpack/

FFTPACK is a package of Fortran subroutines for the fast Fourier transform. It includes complex, real, sine, cosine, and quarter-wave transforms. It was developed by Paul Swarztrauber of the National Center for Atmospheric Research, and is included in the general-purpose mathematical library SLATEC.

Much of the package is also available in C and Java translations.

== See also ==
- Fastest Fourier Transform in the West (FFTW)
- LAPACK
- List of open-source mathematical libraries
