= Steven Gaal =

Hungarian American mathematician (1924–2016)

- Born: February 22, 1924; Hungary
- Died: 17 March 2016 (aged 92)
- Scientific career
- Fields: Mathematician
- Institutions: Centre National del la Recherche Scientifique; Yale; Princeton; University of Minnesota
- Doctoral advisor: F. Riesz; L. Fejér

Steven Alexander Gaal (February 22, 1924 – March 17, 2016) (also known as István Sándor Gál or I. S. Gál) was a Hungarian-American mathematician and Professor of Mathematics at the University of Minnesota—Minneapolis.

== Education ==
Gaal received his Ph.D. under Frigyes Riesz and Lipót Fejér in 1947, although at the time, graduate study in Hungary did not exist in the formal way it is thought of today. There were no formalities of preliminary exams or qualifying exams, no thesis advisor or tuition. After World War I, Hungary was dismembered and the Austro-Hungarian monarchy ended. Two thirds of Hungary's territory was given to other states, some existing, others created and since vanished. Under these conditions, only few higher education faculty could be appointed and students had to learn only from books or one or two old sick professors. Nevertheless, doctoral students managed to create publishable theses. Gaal's thesis problem had its origin in a letter Paul Erdős wrote to Pál Turán, in which he mentions a prize problem posed by the Netherlands Mathematical Society. Gaal solved it and with Erdős jointly published the solution.

== Career ==
Gaal later went to Paris, where he was employed by the CNRS (Centre National del la Recherche Scientifique) at the rank of attaché de recherché. His supervisor was Jean Favard with higher supervisor Jacques Hadamard. Gaal met many leading French mathematicians at the CNRS, including Jean Leray and both Élie and Henri Cartan. After emigrating to the United States, he held positions at Yale and Princeton before joining the faculty of the School of Mathematics at the University of Minnesota. Atle Selberg was instrumental in bringing Gaal to the Institute for Advanced Study in Princeton, New Jersey. While in Princeton, Gaal met Albert Einstein, though the two did not work together. It also was in Paris that Gaal had first met Paul Erdős. Seven years later, they wrote two more joint papers. Over the years, Gaal met Erdős on a number of other occasions, including his last visit to Minneapolis on the invitation of Carleton College, who sponsored his visit. Robert Langlands has cited Gaal's influence in his early investigations of zeta functions and Eisenstein series. Gaal's former wife, Lisl Gaal (originally Lisl Novak), is an accomplished mathematician in her own right and is well known for her text Classical Galois Theory. In 2004, Gaal was honored at the Hungarian Academy of Sciences 80th anniversary as one of the "big five" most distinguished Hungarian mathematicians. The other honorees included John Horvath, János Aczél, Ákos Császár and László Fuchs. Gaal gave a talk entitled "When is a Fibonacci sequence periodic?"

== Books ==
- Gaal, Steven A. (1961). Lectures on algebraic and analytic number theory: With special emphasis on the theory of the Zeta functions of number fields and function fields. Jones Letter Service. ASIN B0007FPWF6. (453 pp.)
- Gaal, Steven A. (2002). Diophantine Equations and Power Integral Bases: Theory and Algorithms. Springer. ISBN 978-0817642716. (208 pp.)
- Gaal, Steven A. (23 April 2009). Point Set Topology. Courier Corporation. ISBN 9780486472225. 1st edition 1964. Academic Press.
- Gaal, Steven A. (6 December 2012). Linear Analysis and Representation Theory. Springer. ISBN 9783642807411. 1st edition 1973. Springer.
