= Lipót Fejér =

Hungarian mathematician (1880–1959)

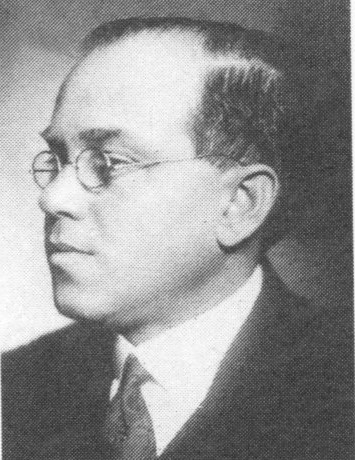
- Fejér c. 1928
- Born: 9 February 1880; Pécs, Austria-Hungary
- Died: 15 October 1959 (aged 79); Budapest, Hungary
- Education: University of Budapest
- Known for: Fejér kernel Fejér quadrature Fejér's theorem Fejér–Riesz theorem
- Scientific career
- Fields: Mathematics
- Workplaces: University of Budapest; University of Berlin
- Doctoral advisor: Hermann Schwarz
- Doctoral students: Paul Erdős; John von Neumann; George Pólya; Tibor Radó; László Kalmár; Marcel Riesz; John Horvath; Gábor Szegő; Michael Fekete; János Aczél; Steven Gaal
- Other notable students: Cornelius Lanczos

Lipót Fejér (or Leopold Fejér, Hungarian pronunciation: [ˈfɛjeːr]; born Leopold Weisz; 9 February 1880 – 15 October 1959) was a Hungarian mathematician.

== Biography ==
He was born Leopold Weisz in Pécs, Austria-Hungary, into the Jewish family of Victoria Goldberger and Samuel Weiss. His maternal great-grandfather Samuel Nachod was a doctor and his grandfather was a renowned scholar, author of a Hebrew-Hungarian dictionary. Leopold's father, Samuel Weiss, was a shopkeeper in Pecs. In primary schools Leopold was not doing well, so for a while his father took him away to home schooling. The future scientist developed his interest in mathematics in high school thanks to his teacher Sigismund Maksay. He changed to the Hungarian name Fejér around 1900.

Fejér studied mathematics and physics at the University of Budapest and at the University of Berlin, where he was taught by Hermann Schwarz. In 1902 he earned his doctorate from University of Budapest (today Eötvös Loránd University). From 1902 to 1905 Fejér taught there and from 1905 until 1911 he taught at Franz Joseph University in Kolozsvár in Austria-Hungary (now Cluj-Napoca in Romania). In 1911 Fejér was appointed to the chair of mathematics at the University of Budapest and he held that post until his death. He was elected corresponding member (1908), member (1930) of the Hungarian Academy of Sciences.

During his period in the chair at Budapest Fejér led a Hungarian school of analysis. He was the thesis advisor of mathematicians such as John von Neumann, Paul Erdős, George Pólya and Pál Turán. During his tenure, Hungary had developed a strong mathematical school: a new generation of educated students had formed who went on to become eminent scientists. As Polya recalled, a large number of them became interested in mathematics thanks to Fejér, his fascinating personality and charisma. Fejér gave short (no more than an hour) but very entertaining lectures and often sat with students in cafés, discussing mathematical problems and telling stories from his life and how he interacted with the world's leading mathematicians.

Fejér's research concentrated on harmonic analysis and, in particular, Fourier series.

Fejér collaborated to produce important papers, one with Carathéodory on entire functions in 1907 and another major work with Frigyes Riesz in 1922 on conformal mappings (specifically, a short proof of the Riemann mapping theorem).

In 1944, Fejér was forced to resign because of his Jewish background. One night at the end of December 1944, members of the Arrow Cross Party stormed into his house. Fejér and all the residents of his house were convoyed to the banks of the Danube and were about to be shot, but were miraculously saved by a phone call "from a brave officer". Fejér was later found in a hospital in the city, where he was admitted "under unexplained circumstances". This severe trauma left a permanent mark on the scientist's mental faculties, something even he himself noticed and later often said of himself "since I became an idiot". Still, according to his colleagues, he kept on an even keel until mid-1950s, when he became senile.

Lipót Fejér died in Budapest on 15 October 1959. His grave is in the distinguished Kerepesi Cemetery.

== Pólya on Fejér ==
If you could see him in his rather Bohemian attire (which was, I suspect, carefully chosen) you would find him very eccentric. Yet he would not appear so in his natural habitat, in a certain section of Budapest middle-class society, many members of which had the same manners, if not quite the same mannerisms, as Fejér — there he would appear about half eccentric.

— George Pólya, George Pólya, "Some mathematicians I have known", Amer. Math. Monthly 76 (1969), 746–753

Pólya writes the following about Fejér, telling us much about his personality:

He had artistic tastes. He deeply loved music and was a good pianist. He liked a well-turned phrase. 'As to earning a living', he said, 'a professor's salary is a necessary, but not sufficient, condition.' Once he was very angry with a colleague who happened to be a topologist, and explaining the case at length he wound up by declaring '... and what he is saying is a topological mapping of the truth'.

He had a quick eye for foibles and miseries; in seemingly dull situations he noticed points that were unexpectedly funny or unexpectedly pathetic. He carefully cultivated his talent of raconteur; when he told, with his characteristic gestures, of the little shortcomings of a certain great mathematician, he was irresistible. The hours spent in continental coffee houses with Fejér discussing mathematics and telling stories are a cherished recollection for many of us. Fejér presented his mathematical remarks with the same verve as his stories, and this may have helped him in winning the lasting interest of so many younger men in his problems.

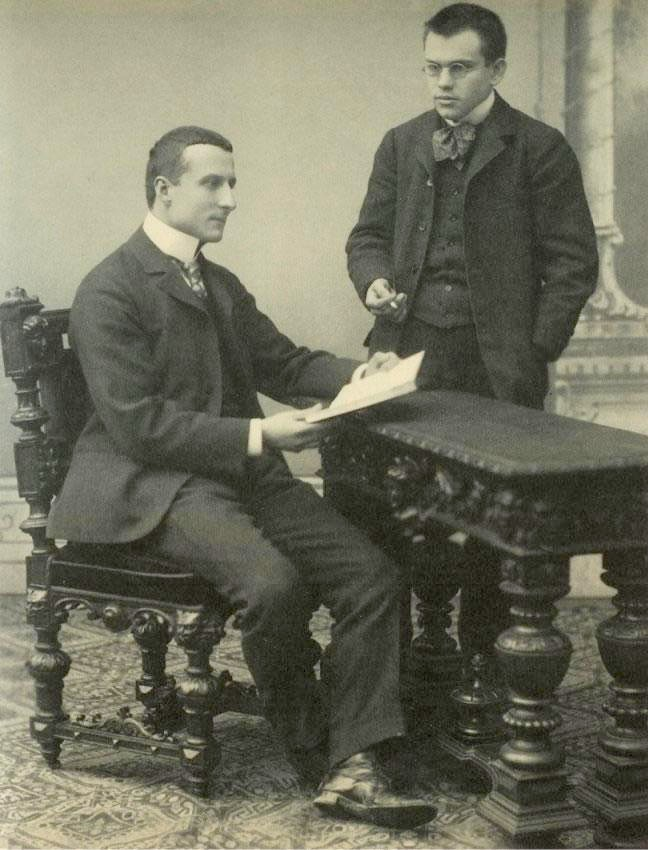
Lipót Fejér (standing to the right), with Greek mathematician Constantin Carathéodory (1873–1950; left)

In the same article Pólya writes about Fejér's style of mathematics:

Fejér talked about a paper he was about to write up. 'When I write a paper,' he said, 'I have to rederive for myself the rules of differentiation and sometimes even the commutative law of multiplication.' These words stuck in my memory and years later I came to think that they expressed an essential aspect of Fejér's mathematical talent; his love for the intuitively clear detail.

It was not given to him to solve very difficult problems or to build vast conceptual structures. Yet he could perceive the significance, the beauty, and the promise of a rather concrete not too large problem, foresee the possibility of a solution and work at it with intensity. And, when he had found the solution, he kept on working at it with loving care, till each detail became fully transparent.

It is due to such care spent on the elaboration of the solution that Fejér's papers are very clearly written, and easy to read and most of his proofs appear very clear and simple. Yet only the very naive may think that it is easy to write a paper that is easy to read, or that it is a simple thing to point out a significant problem that is capable of a simple solution.

== Gallery ==
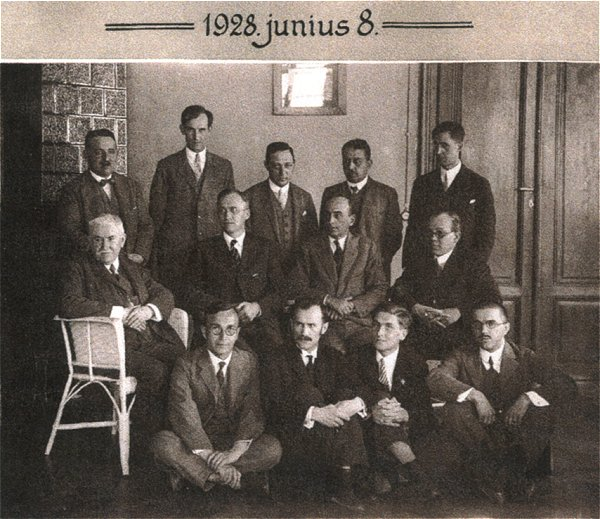
(Left to right); Standing: Frigyes Riesz, Béla Kerékjártó, Alfréd Haar, Gyula Kőnig, Rudolf Ortvay; On chairs: József Kürschák, George David Birkhoff, O.D. Kellog, Lipót Fejér; Sitting on the floor: Tibor Radó, István Lipka, László Kalmár, Pál Szász

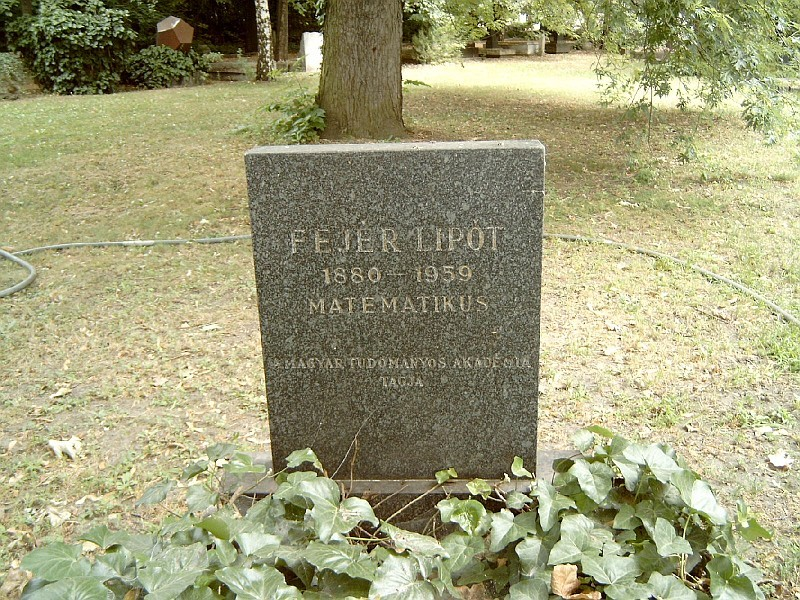
Fejér's grave in Kerepesi Cemetery, Budapest

== See also ==
- Fejér window
- Real algebraic geometry

== Sources ==
- Szegö, Gabor (1960). "Leopold Fejér: In memoriam, 1880-1959". Bull. Amer. Math. Soc. 66 (5): 346–352. doi:10.1090/S0002-9904-1960-10441-7. MR 0114742.
- Hersch, Reuben (1993). "A Visit to Hungarian Mathematics". The Mathematical Intelligencer. 15 (2): 13–26. doi:10.1007/BF03024187. S2CID 122827181.
- Struik, Dirk J. (1987). A Concise History of Mathematics: Fourth Revised Edition. Courier Corporation. p. 213. ISBN 9780486138886.
