= Miklos Gaál =

Finnish photographer

- Born: 1974 (age 51–52); Espoo, Finland
- Occupation: Artist

Miklos Gaál (born 1974 in Espoo, Finland) is a Finnish-Hungarian artist and photographer living in Amsterdam and Helsinki.
