= HNLMS Van Galen =

HNLMS Van Galen (Dutch: Hr.Ms. or Zr.Ms. Van Galen) may refer to following ships of the Royal Netherlands Navy:

- HNLMS Van Galen (1872), a wooden hulled corvette
- HNLMS Van Galen (1928), an Admiralen-class destroyer
- HNLMS Van Galen (G84), the ex-HMS Noble
- HNLMS Van Galen (F803), a Van Speijk-class frigate
- HNLMS Van Galen (F834), a Karel Doorman-class frigate
