= Sándor Gaál =

Hungarian physicist (1885–1972)

Gaál Sándor (born 8 October 1885 in Gogánváralja, Hungary, died 28 July 1972) was a Hungarian accelerator physicist and an alleged co-inventor of the cyclotron.

Most credible international sources give the credit of the invention of the cyclotron to American physicist and Nobel Laureate Ernest Orlando Lawrence, who invented the cyclotron during the spring of 1929 and built the first operational cyclotron in 1930 while at the University of California, Berkeley. In November 1939, Ernest O. Lawrence was awarded the Nobel Prize in Physics for his work on the cyclotron and its applications.

In his main work, "Fizica teoretica" (Bucuresti, 1957, vol. I, p. 270) Teofil Vescan, professor of Bolyai University in Kolozsvár (Cluj) revealed that Gaál Sándor may have described the cyclotron's working at about the same time as Ernest O. Lawrence during the spring of 1929. In 1929 Gaál allegedly sent a study, with the title Die Kaskadenröhre. Ein Beitrag zum Problem der Atomkernzerstrümmerung to the physics periodical Zeitschrift für Physik. The paper registered the study as of 6 May 1929 but it was not printed because the editors missed the topic of the study and erroneously thought that it dealt with particle accelerators, a problem already solved in 1928 by Norwegian physicist Rolf Wideröe.

Gaál died in poverty in Csernát, Romania.
