= Lisl Gaal =

Austrian-born American mathematician (1924–2024)

(Ilse) Lisl Novak Gaal (January 17, 1924 – October 7, 2024) was an Austrian-born American mathematician known for her contributions to set theory and Galois theory. She was the first woman to hold a tenure-track position in mathematics at Cornell University, and was an associate professor emeritus at the University of Minnesota. Gaal died in 2024, at the age of 100.

== Contributions ==
Gaal's dissertation work was in the foundations of mathematics. It proved that two different systems for set theory that had previously been proposed as foundational were equiconsistent: either both are valid or both lead to contradictions. These two systems were Zermelo set theory and Von Neumann set theory. They differed from each other in that von Neumann had added to Zermelo's theory a notion of classes, collections of mathematical objects that are defined by some property but do not necessarily form a set. (Often, intuitively, proper classes are "too big" to form sets; for instance, the collection of all sets cannot itself be a set, by Russell's paradox, but it can be a class.) Gaal's work showed that introducing this extra notion of a class is a safe step, one that does not introduce any new inconsistencies into the system.

Gaal was also the author of two books:

- Classical Galois Theory with Examples (Markham Publishing, 1971; third ed., Chelsea Publishing, 1979; reprinted 1998)
- A Mathematical Gallery (American Mathematical Society, 2017)

== Early life and education ==
Gaal was born in Vienna on January 17, 1924, the daughter of a gynecologist and the sister of Gertrude M. Novak, who became a physician in Chicago. She and her two sisters escaped Nazi Germany, and moved with their family to New York City.

After graduating from Hunter College with an A.B. in 1944, Gaal earned a doctorate in 1948 from Harvard University, through Radcliffe College. Her dissertation, On the Consistency of Goedel's Axioms for Class and Set Theory Relative to a Weaker Set of Axioms, was jointly supervised by Lynn Harold Loomis and Willard Van Orman Quine.

== Later career ==
Gaal lived in Berkeley, California from 1950 to 1951. She and her husband, mathematician Steven Gaal, both moved to Cornell University, beginning as instructors in 1953 but then in 1954 being promoted to assistant professors. This step was the first time the Cornell mathematics department had offered a tenure-track position to a woman. She also became the first woman at Cornell to advise the doctorate of a mathematics student, Angelo Margaris.

The Gaals moved again in 1957, to the University of Minnesota, where she became an associate professor emeritus.

In later life, Gaal became a lithographer, making prints that combined mathematical themes with Minnesota scenes. Her book A Mathematical Gallery collects some of her mathematical illustrations.
