= Fourier sine and cosine series =

Special cases of the Fourier series

In mathematics, particularly the field of calculus and Fourier analysis, the Fourier sine and cosine series are two mathematical series named after Joseph Fourier based on sine and cosine.

== Notation ==
In this article, f denotes a real-valued function on $\mathbb{R}$ which is periodic with period 2L.

== Sine series ==
If f is an odd function with period $2L$, then the Fourier Half Range sine series of f is defined to be
$$f(x) = \sum_{n=1}^\infty b_n \sin \left(\frac{n\pi x}{L}\right)$$
which is just a form of complete Fourier series with the only difference that $a_0$ and $a_n$ are zero, and the series is defined for half of the interval.

In the formula we have
$$b_n = \frac{2}{L} \int_0^L f(x) \sin \left(\frac{n\pi x}{L}\right) \, dx, \quad n \in \mathbb{N} .$$

== Cosine series ==
If f is an even function with a period $2L$, then the Fourier cosine series is defined to be
$$f(x) = \frac{a_0}{2} + \sum_{n=1}^{\infty} a_n \cos \left(\frac{n \pi x}{L}\right)$$
where
$$a_n = \frac{2}{L} \int_0^L f(x) \cos \left(\frac{n\pi x}{L}\right) \, dx, \quad n \in \mathbb{N}_0 .$$

== Remarks ==
This notion can be generalized to functions which are not even or odd, but then the above formulas will look different.

== See also ==
- Fourier series
- Fourier analysis
- Least-squares spectral analysis

== Bibliography ==
- Byerly, William Elwood (1893). "Chapter 2: Development in Trigonometric Series". An Elementary Treatise on Fourier's Series: And Spherical, Cylindrical, and Ellipsoidal Harmonics, with Applications to Problems in Mathematical Physics (2 ed.). Ginn. p. 30.
- Carslaw, Horatio Scott (1921). "Chapter 7: Fourier's Series". Introduction to the Theory of Fourier's Series and Integrals, Volume 1 (2 ed.). Macmillan and Company. p. 196.
