= Leo Samuele Olschki =

Italian publisher

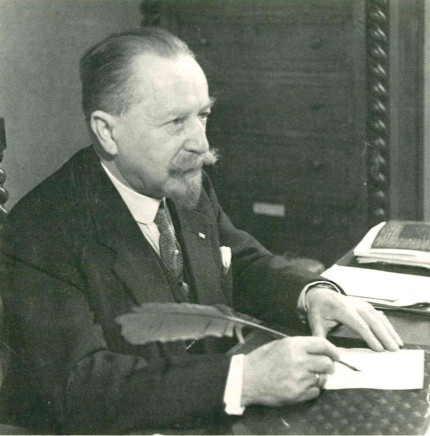
- Born: 2 January 1861; Johannisburg, East Prussia
- Died: 17 June 1940 (aged 79); Geneva, Switzerland
- Occupation: Publisher
- Awards: Commander of the Order of the Crown; Knight of the Order of the Crown

Leo Samuele Olschki (born Lev Samuel Olschki; 2 January 1861 – 17 June 1940) was an Italian publisher of Prussian Jewish origin.

== Biography ==
Leo Olschki was born on 2 January 1861 in Johannisburg, a town in East Prussia, into a family of Jewish printers. He learned the bookseller trade in Berlin in the historic Calvary bookshop. In 1886 he founded the Leo S. Olschki publishing house in Verona, which was then moved to Venice and Florence (1897). He also subsidized newspapers such as Giornale Dantesco and La Cultura, but during the First World War he moved to Geneva, in neutral territory. In fact, Olschki did not have Italian citizenship, having kept a German passport, and was forced into exile. In Geneva he founded the salso (acronym for Societé Anonime Leo S. Olschki). In 1920, after the war, he returned to Italy. For his work, he obtained such recognition as the appointment as Commander and Knight of the Grand Cross of the Crown of Italy, but was again forced into exile due to racial laws, as a Jew. He then returned for the second time to Switzerland in 1939, where he died in 1940.

== Bibliography ==
- C. Frati, Editori italiani: Leo S. Olschki, in «L'Italia che scrive», IV, 1921, pp. 159–160 (in Italian).
- L. S. Olschki, Aus den Erinnerungen eines Dante-Verlegers, in «Deutsches Dante-Jahrbuch», XV, 1915, pp. 132–140 (in German).
- Alessandro Olschki, ed. (1999). Centotredici anni. Catalogo storico della Mostra, Firenze, Biblioteca nazionale centrale, 22 aprile-23 maggio 1999 (in Italian). Florence: Olschki. ISBN 88-222-4738-8.
