= GNU Scientific Library =

Library for numerical analysis in C and C++

- Original authors: Mark Galassi, James Theiler, Brian Gough, Gerard Jungman and many others
- Developer: GNU Project
- Initial release: May 1996; 30 years ago
- Stable release: 2.8 / 25 May 2024
- Written in: C
- Type: Numerical library
- License: 2007: GPL-3.0-or-later (Note: GPL-3.0-or-later since 2007-07-02.); 1996: GPL-2.0-or-later (Note: GPL-2.0-or-later from 1996-07-08 until 2007-07-02.)
- Website: www.gnu.org/software/gsl/
- Repository: ftpmirror.gnu.org/gsl/

The GNU Scientific Library (or GSL) is a software library for numerical computations in applied mathematics and science. The GSL is written in C; wrappers are available for other programming languages. The GSL is part of the GNU Project and is distributed under the GNU General Public License.

== Project history ==
The GSL project was initiated in 1996 by physicists Mark Galassi and James Theiler of Los Alamos National Laboratory. They aimed at writing a modern replacement for widely used but somewhat outdated Fortran libraries such as Netlib. They carried out the overall design and wrote early modules; with that ready they recruited other scientists to contribute.

The "overall development of the library and the design and implementation of the major modules" was carried out by Brian Gough and Gerard Jungman. Other major contributors were Jim Davies, Reid Priedhorsky, M. Booth, and F. Rossi.

Version 1.0 was released in 2001. In the following years, the library expanded only slowly; as the documentation stated, the maintainers were more interested in stability than in additional functionality. Major version 1 ended with release 1.16 of July 2013; this was the only public activity in the three years 2012–2014.

Vigorous development resumed with publication of version 2.0 in October 2015, which included user contributed patches. The latest version 2.8 was released in May 2024.

== Example ==
The following example program calculates the value of the Bessel function of the first kind and order zero for 5:

#include <stdio.h>
#include <gsl/gsl_sf_bessel.h>

int main(void)
{
  double x = 5.0;
  double y = gsl_sf_bessel_J0(x);
  printf("J0(%g) = %.18e\n", x, y);
  return 0;
}

The example program has to be linked to the GSL library upon compilation:

$ gcc $(gsl-config --cflags) example.c $(gsl-config --libs)

The output is shown below and should be correct to double-precision accuracy:

J0(5) = -1.775967713143382920e-01

== Features ==
The software library provides facilities for:

- Basic mathematical functions
- Complex numbers
- Polynomials
- B-splines
- Special functions
- Vectors and matrices
- Permutations
- Combinations
- Multisets
- Sorting
- BLAS
- Linear algebra
- Eigensystems
- Fast Fourier transforms
- Numerical integration (based on QUADPACK)
- Random number generation
- Quasi-random sequences
- Random number distributions
- Statistics
- Histograms
- N-tuples
- Monte Carlo integration
- Simulated annealing
- Ordinary differential equations
- Interpolation
- Numerical differentiation
- Chebyshev approximations
- Series acceleration
- Discrete Hankel transform
- Root finding in one and multiple dimensions
- Minimization in one and multiple dimensions
- Least-squares fitting
- Nonlinear least-squares fitting
- Physical constants
- IEEE floating-point arithmetic
- Discrete wavelet transform

=== Programming-language bindings ===
Since the GSL is written in C, it is straightforward to provide wrappers for other programming languages. Such wrappers currently exist for

- AMPL
- C++
- Fortran
- Haskell
- Java
- Julia
- Common Lisp
- Nim
- OCaml
- GNU Octave
- Perl Data Language
- Python
- R
- Ruby
- Rust

=== C++ support ===
The GSL can be used in C++ classes, but not using pointers to member functions, because the type of pointer to member function is different from pointer to function. Instead, pointers to static functions have to be used. Another common workaround is using a functor.

C++ wrappers for GSL are available. Not all of these are regularly maintained. They do offer access to matrix and vector classes without having to use GSL's interface to malloc and free functions. Some also offer support for also creating workspaces that behave like smart pointer classes. Finally, there is (limited, as of April 2020) support for allowing the user to create classes to represent a parameterised function as a functor.

While not strictly wrappers, there are some C++ classes that allow C++ users to use the Gnu Scientific Library with wrapper features.

== See also ==
- List of numerical-analysis software
- List of numerical libraries
- List of open-source mathematical libraries
- Netlib
- Numerical Recipes
