= Public domain =

Works outside the scope of copyright law

The public domain (PD) consists of all creative works to which no exclusive intellectual property rights apply. Those rights may have expired, be forfeit, have been waived, or be inapplicable. Because no one holds the exclusive rights, anyone can legally use or reference those works without permission.

As examples, the works of William Shakespeare, Ludwig van Beethoven, Miguel de Cervantes, Zoroaster, Lao Zi, Confucius, Aristotle, L. Frank Baum, Leonardo da Vinci and Georges Méliès are in the public domain either by virtue of their having been created before copyright existed, or by their copyright term having expired. Some works are not covered by a country's copyright laws, and are therefore in the public domain; for example, in the United States, items excluded from copyright include the formulae of Newtonian physics and cooking recipes. Other works are actively dedicated by their authors to the public domain (see waiver); examples include reference implementations of cryptographic algorithms. The term public domain is not normally applied to situations where the creator of a work retains residual rights, in which case use of the work is referred to as "under license" or "with permission".

As rights vary by country and jurisdiction, a work may be subject to rights in one country and be in the public domain in another. Some rights depend on registrations on a country-by-country basis, and the absence of registration in a particular country, if required, gives rise to public-domain status for a work in that country. The term public domain may also be interchangeably used with other imprecise or undefined terms such as the public sphere or commons, including concepts such as the "commons of the mind", the "intellectual commons", and the "information commons".

== History ==
Although the term domain did not come into use until the mid-18th century, the concept can be traced back to the ancient Roman law, "as a preset system included in the property right system". The Romans had a large proprietary rights system where they defined "many things that cannot be privately owned" as res nullius, res communes, res publicae and res universitatis. The term res nullius was defined as things not yet appropriated. The term res communes was defined as "things that could be commonly enjoyed by mankind, such as air, sunlight and ocean." The term res publicae referred to things that were shared by all citizens, and the term res universitatis meant things that were owned by the municipalities of Rome. When looking at it from a historical perspective, one could say the construction of the idea of "public domain" sprouted from the concepts of res communes, res publicae, and res universitatis in early Roman law.

When the first early copyright law was originally established in Britain with the Statute of Anne in 1710, public domain did not appear. However, similar concepts were developed by British and French jurists in the 18th century. Instead of "public domain", they used terms such as publici juris or propriété publique to describe works that were not covered by copyright law.

The phrase "fall in the public domain" can be traced to mid-19th-century France to describe the end of copyright term. The French poet Alfred de Vigny equated the expiration of copyright with a work falling "into the sink hole of public domain" and if the public domain receives any attention from intellectual property lawyers it is still treated as little more than that which is left when intellectual property rights, such as copyright, patents, and trademarks, expire or are abandoned. In this historical context Paul Torremans describes copyright as a "little coral reef of private right jutting up from the ocean of the public domain". Copyright law differs by country, and the American legal scholar Pamela Samuelson has described the public domain as being "different sizes at different times in different countries".

== Definition ==
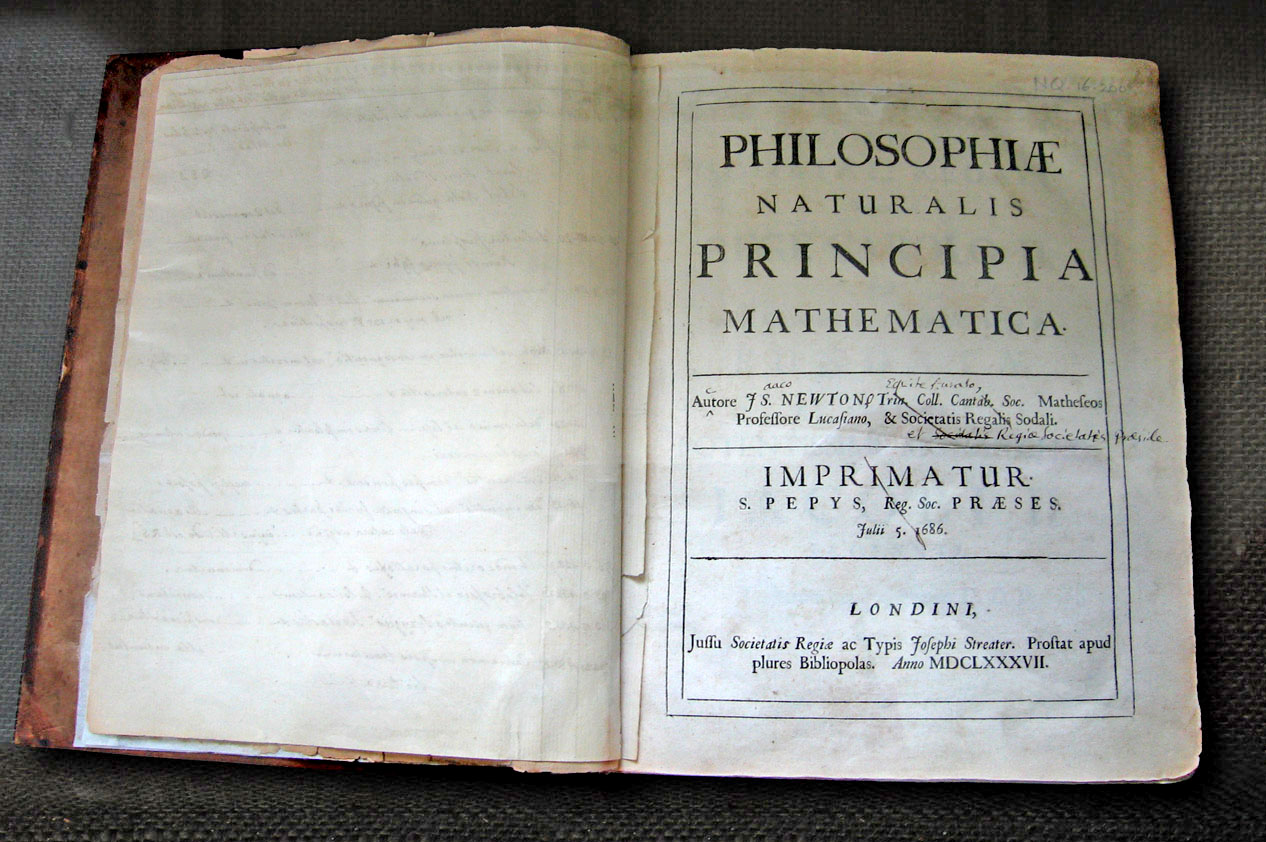
Newton's own copy of his Principia, with hand-written corrections for the second edition

Definitions of the boundaries of the public domain in relation to copyright, or intellectual property more generally, regard the public domain as a negative space; that is, it consists of works that are no longer in copyright term or were never protected by copyright law. According to James Boyle, this definition underlines common usage of the term public domain and equates the public domain to public property and works in copyright to private property. However, the usage of the term public domain can be more granular, including for example uses of works in copyright permitted by copyright exceptions. Such a definition regards work in copyright as private property subject to fair use rights and limitation on ownership. A conceptual definition comes from Lange, who focused on what the public domain should be: "it should be a place of sanctuary for individual creative expression, a sanctuary conferring affirmative protection against the forces of private appropriation that threatened such expression". Patterson and Lindberg described the public domain not as a "territory", but rather as a concept: "[T]here are certain materials – the air we breathe, sunlight, rain, space, life, creations, thoughts, feelings, ideas, words, numbers – not subject to private ownership. The materials that compose our cultural heritage must be free for all living to use no less than matter necessary for biological survival." The term public domain may also be interchangeably used with other imprecise or undefined terms such as the public sphere or commons, including concepts such as the "commons of the mind", the "intellectual commons", and the "information commons".

== Public domain by medium ==
=== Books ===
A public-domain book is a book with no copyright, a book that was created without a license, or a book where its copyrights expired or have been forfeited.

In most countries the term of protection of copyright expires on the first day of January, 70 years after the death of the latest living author. The longest copyright term is in Mexico, which has life plus 100 years for all deaths since July 1928.

A notable exception is the United States, where every book and tale published before 1931 is in the public domain; US copyrights last for 95 years for books originally published between 1931 and 1978 if the copyright was properly registered and maintained.

For example: the works of Jane Austen, Lewis Carroll, Machado de Assis, Olavo Bilac and Edgar Allan Poe are in the public domain worldwide as they all died over 100 years ago.

Project Gutenberg, the Internet Archive and Wikisource make tens of thousands of public domain books available online as ebooks.

=== Music ===
People have been creating music for millennia. The first musical notation system, the Music of Mesopotamia system, was created 4,000 years ago. Guido of Arezzo introduced Latin musical notation in the 10th century. This laid the foundation for the preservation of global music in the public domain, a distinction formalized alongside copyright systems in the 17th century. Musicians copyrighted their publications of musical notation as literary writings, but performing copyrighted pieces and creating derivative works were not restricted by early copyright laws. Copying was widespread, in compliance with the law, but expansions of those laws intended to benefit literary works and responding to commercial music recording technology's reproducibility have led to stricter rules. Relatively recently, a normative view that copying in music is not desirable and lazy has become popular among professional musicians.

US copyright laws distinguish between musical compositions and sound recordings, the former of which refers to melody, notation or lyrics created by a composer or lyricist, including sheet music, and the latter referring to a recording performed by an artist, including a CD, LP, or digital sound file. Musical compositions fall under the same general rule of 95 years after publication, so anything published before 1930 is considered public domain (as of 2025). Sound recordings, on the other hand, are subject to different rules and are not eligible for public domain status until 2021–2067, depending on the date and location of publishing, unless explicitly released beforehand.

The Musopen project records music in the public domain for the purposes of making the music available to the general public in a high-quality audio format. Online musical archives preserve collections of classical music recorded by Musopen and offer them for download/distribution as a public service.

=== Films ===
The 1968 horror film Night of the Living Dead is in the public domain in the United States because its theatrical distributor failed to place a copyright indication on the prints, as would have been required to obtain a copyright at that time.

A public-domain film is a film that was never under copyright, was released to public domain by its author, or whose copyright has expired. All films released in the United States before 1 January 1931 have entered the public domain in that country.

== Value ==
Pamela Samuelson has identified eight "values" that can arise from information and works in the public domain.

Possible values include:

1. Building blocks for the creation of new knowledge, examples include data, facts, ideas, theories, and scientific principle.
2. Access to cultural heritage through information resources such as ancient Greek texts and Mozart's symphonies.
3. Promoting education, through the spread of information, ideas, and scientific principles.
4. Enabling follow-on innovation, through for example expired patents and copyright.
5. Enabling low cost access to information without the need to locate the owner or negotiate rights clearance and pay royalties, through for example expired copyrighted works or patents, and non-original data compilation.
6. Promoting public health and safety, through information and scientific principles.
7. Promoting the democratic process and values, through news, laws, regulation, and judicial opinion.
8. Enabling competitive imitation, through for example expired patents and copyright, or publicly disclosed technologies that do not qualify for patent protection.

== Relationship with derivative works ==
Derivative works include translations, musical arrangements, and dramatizations of a work, as well as other forms of transformation or adaptation. Copyrighted works may not be used for derivative works without permission from the copyright owner, while public domain works can be freely used for derivative works without permission. Artworks that are public domain may also be reproduced photographically or artistically or used as the basis of new, interpretive works. Works derived from public domain works can be copyrighted.

Once works enter into the public domain, derivative works such as adaptations in book and film may increase noticeably, as happened with Frances Hodgson Burnett's novel The Secret Garden, which became public domain in the US in 1977 and most of the rest of the world in 1995. By 1999, the plays of Shakespeare, all public domain, had been used in more than 420 feature-length films. In addition to straightforward adaptation, they have been used as the launching point for transformative retellings such as Tom Stoppard's Rosencrantz and Guildenstern Are Dead and Troma Entertainment's Tromeo and Juliet. Marcel Duchamp's L.H.O.O.Q. is a derivative of Leonardo da Vinci's Mona Lisa, one of thousands of derivative works based on the public domain painting. The 2018 film A Star is Born is a remake of the 1937 film of the same name, which is in the public domain due to an unrenewed copyright.

=== Rights in public domain reproduction ===
Courts in different jurisdictions have come to different conclusions as to whether the reproduction of a public domain work gains its own rights protection, or whether it too is in the public domain. In a German 2016 case, the Reiss-Engelhorn-Museen, an art museum, sued Wikimedia Commons over photographs uploaded to the database depicting pieces of art in the museum. The museum claimed that the photos were taken by their staff, and that photography within the museum by visitors was prohibited. Therefore, photos taken by the museum, even of material that itself had fallen into the public domain, were protected by copyright law and would need to be removed from the Wikimedia image repository. The court ruled that the photographs taken by the museum would be protected under the German Copyright Act, stating that since the photographer needed to make practical decisions about the photograph that it was protected material. In contrast, in the 1999 US case Bridgeman Art Library v. Corel Corp., the court ruled that exact photographic copies of public domain images could not be protected by copyright in the United States because the copies lack originality.

== Perpetual copyright ==
In some countries, certain works may never fully lapse into the public domain. In the United Kingdom, for example, there is a perpetual crown copyright for the Authorized King James Version of the Bible.

While the copyright has expired for the Peter Pan works by J. M. Barrie (the play Peter Pan, or the Boy Who Wouldn't Grow Up and the novel Peter and Wendy) in the United Kingdom, it was granted a special exception under the Copyright, Designs and Patents Act 1988 (Schedule 6) that requires royalties to be paid for commercial performances, publications and broadcasts of the story of Peter Pan within the UK, as long as Great Ormond Street Hospital (to whom Barrie gave the copyright) continues to exist.

In a paying public domain regime, works that have entered the public domain after their copyright has expired, or traditional knowledge and traditional cultural expressions that have never been subject to copyright, are still subject to royalties payable to the state or to an authors' association. The user does not have to seek permission to copy, present or perform the work, but does have to pay the fee. Typically the royalties are directed to support of living artists.

== Public domain mark ==
Creative Commons' Public Domain Mark

In 2010, Creative Commons proposed the Public Domain Mark (PDM) as symbol to indicate that a work is free of known copyright restrictions and therefore in the public domain. The public domain mark is a combination of the copyright symbol, which acts as copyright notice, with the international 'no' symbol. The Europeana databases use it, and for instance on the Wikimedia Commons in February 2016 2.9 million works (~10% of all works) are listed with the mark.

== Application to copyrightable works ==
=== Works not covered by copyright law ===
The underlying idea that is expressed or manifested in the creation of a work generally cannot be the subject of copyright law (see idea–expression divide). Mathematical formulae will therefore generally form part of the public domain, to the extent that their expression in the form of software is not covered by copyright.

Works created before the existence of copyright and patent laws also form part of the public domain. For example, the Bible and the inventions of Archimedes are in the public domain. However, translations or new formulations of these works may be copyrighted in themselves.

=== Expiration of copyright ===
Determination of whether a copyright has expired depends on an examination of the copyright in its source country.

In most countries that are signatories to the Berne Convention, copyright term is based on the life of the author, and extends to 50 or 70 years beyond the death of the author. (See List of copyright terms of countries.)

In the United States, determining whether a work has entered the public domain or is still under copyright depends upon what the law or regulation was at creation, and whether new regulations have grandfathered in certain older works. Because copyright terms shifted over the course of the 20th century from a fixed-term based on first publication, with a possible renewal term, to a term extending to 50, then 70, years after the death of the author. The claim that "pre-1931 works are in the public domain" is correct only for published works; unpublished works are under federal copyright for at least the life of the author plus 70 years.

Legal traditions differ on whether a work in the public domain can have its copyright restored. In the European Union, the Copyright Duration Directive was applied retroactively, restoring and extending the terms of copyright on material previously in the public domain. Term extensions by the US and Australia generally have not removed works from the public domain, but rather delayed the addition of works to it. However, the United States moved away from that tradition with the Uruguay Round Agreements Act, which removed from the public domain many foreign-sourced works that had previously not been in copyright in the US for failure to comply with US-based formalities requirements. Consequently, in the US, foreign-sourced works and US-sourced works are now treated differently, with foreign-sourced works remaining under copyright regardless of compliance with formalities, while domestically sourced works may be in the public domain if they failed to comply with then-existing formalities requirements—a situation described as odd by some scholars, and unfair by some US-based rightsholders.

=== Government works ===
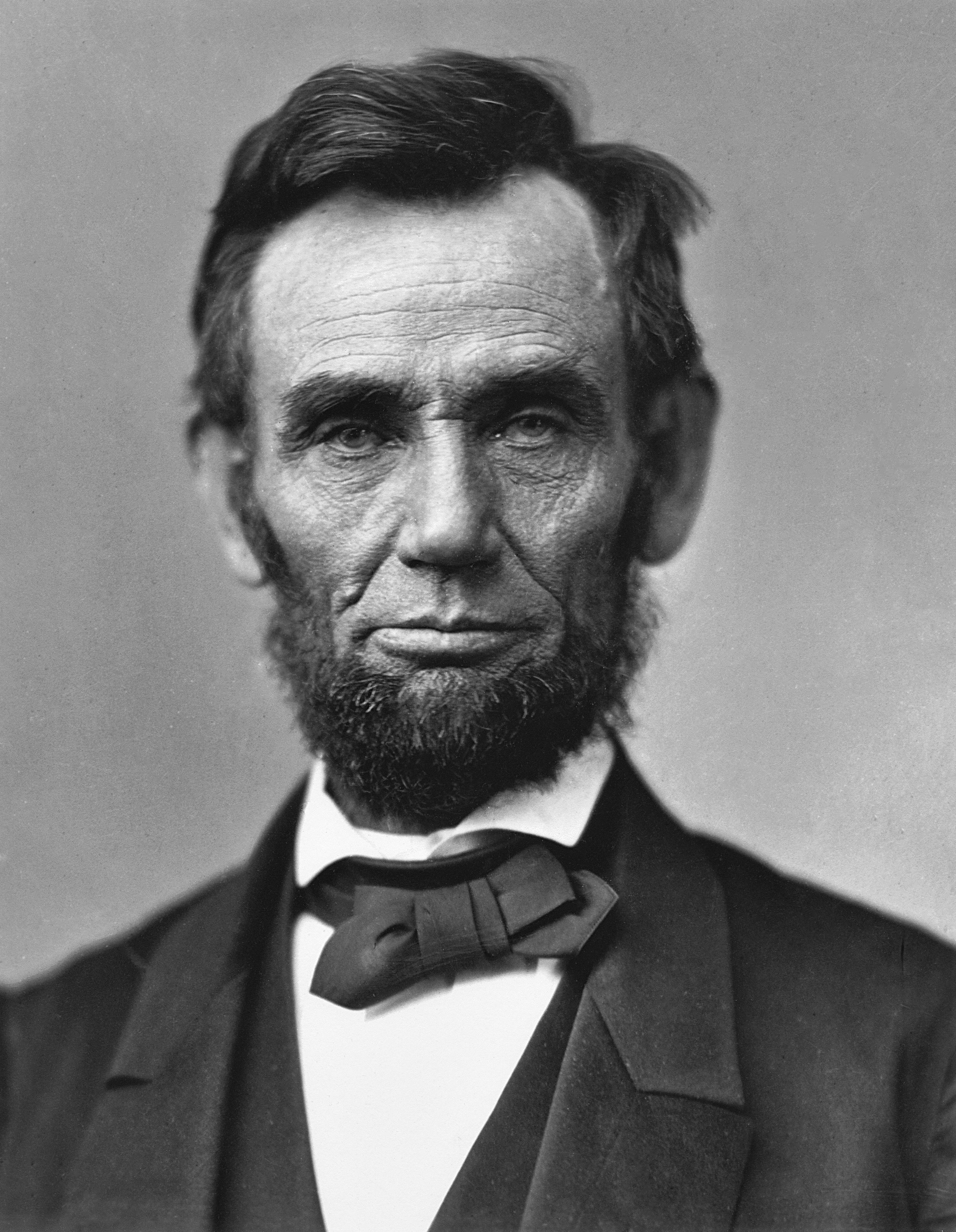
Portraits of United States Presidents, in this case Abraham Lincoln, are in the public domain.

Works of various governments around the world may be excluded from copyright law and may therefore be considered to be in the public domain in their respective countries. They may also be in the public domain in other countries as well. Material in the public domain is still considered so when included as part of larger copyrighted creations.

In the United States, work created by the federal government is not subject to copyright law, placing it within the public domain. However, the government may own and use copyrighted materials that were not initially created by them. Alternatively, materials created by the United Kingdom's government are not automatically in public domain but instead placed under the Open Government Licence. The status of government creations vary depending on the country they are in.

=== Dedicating works to the public domain ===
==== Release without copyright notice ====
Before 1 March 1989, in the US, works could be easily given into the public domain by just releasing it without an explicit copyright notice. With the Berne Convention Implementation Act of 1988 (and the earlier Copyright Act of 1976, which went into effect in 1978), all works were by default copyright-protected and needed to be actively given into public domain by a waiver statement/anti-copyright can call notice. Not all legal systems have processes for reliably donating works to the public domain, e.g. civil law of continental Europe. This may even "effectively prohibit any attempt by copyright owners to surrender rights automatically conferred by law, particularly moral rights".

==== Public-domain-like licenses ====
An alternative is for copyright holders to issue a license which irrevocably grants as many rights as possible to the general public. Real public domain makes licenses unnecessary, as no owner/author is required to grant permission ("Permission culture"). There are multiple licenses which aim to release works into the public domain. In 2000 the WTFPL was released as a public domain like software license. Creative Commons (created in 2002 by Lawrence Lessig, Hal Abelson, and Eric Eldred) has introduced several public-domain-like licenses, called Creative Commons licenses. These give authors of works (that would qualify for copyright) the ability to decide which protections they would like to place on their material. As copyright is the default license for new material, Creative Commons licenses offer authors a variety of options to designate their work under whichever license they wish, as long as this does not violate standing copyright law. For example, a CC BY license allows for re-users to distribute, remix, adapt, and build upon material, while also agreeing to provide attribution to the author in any of these cases. In 2009 the Creative Commons released the CC0, which was created for compatibility with law domains which have no concept of dedicating into public domain. This is achieved by a public domain waiver statement and a fallback all-permissive license, in case the waiver is not possible. Unlike in the US, where author's moral rights are generally not specifically regulated, in some countries where moral rights are protected separately in law it is not possible to waive those rights, but only the rights related to the exploitation of the work. A solution to this issue (as found in the Creative Commons Zero dedication) is to interpret the license by setting "three different layers of action. First, the right holder waives any copyright and related rights that can be waived in accordance with the applicable law. Secondly, if there are rights that the right holder cannot waive under applicable law, they are licensed in a way that mirrors as closely as possible the legal effect of a waiver. And finally, if there are any rights that the right holders cannot waive or license, they affirm that they will not exercise them and they will not assert any claim with respect to the use of the work, once again within the limits of applicable law. (...) In countries where moral rights exist but where they can be waived or not asserted, they are waived if asserted (e.g. the UK). In countries where they cannot be waived they will remain into full effect in accordance to the applicable law (think of France, Spain or Italy where moral rights cannot be waived)." The same occurs in Switzerland.

The Unlicense, published around 2010, has a focus on an anti-copyright message. The Unlicense offers a public domain waiver text with a fallback public domain-like license inspired by permissive licenses but without attribution. Another option is the Zero Clause BSD license, released in 2006 and aimed at software.

In October 2014, the Open Knowledge Foundation recommends the Creative Commons CC0 license to dedicate content to the public domain, and the Open Data Commons Public Domain Dedication and License (PDDL) for data.

== Patents ==
In most countries, the term of rights for patents is 20 years, after which the invention becomes part of the public domain. In the United States, the contents of patents are considered valid and enforceable for 20 years from the date of filing within the United States or 20 years from the earliest date of filing if under 35 USC 120, 121, or 365(c). However, the text and any illustration within a patent, provided the illustrations are essentially line drawings and do not in any substantive way reflect the "personality" of the person drawing them, are not subject to copyright protection. This is separate from the patent rights just mentioned.

== Trademarks ==
A trademark registration may remain in force indefinitely, or expire without specific regard to its age. For a trademark registration to remain valid, the owner must continue to use it. In some circumstances, such as disuse, failure to assert trademark rights, or common usage by the public without regard for its intended use, it could become generic, and therefore part of the public domain.

Because trademarks are registered with governments, some countries or trademark registries may recognize a mark, while others may have determined that it is generic and not allowable as a trademark in that registry. For example, the drug acetylsalicylic acid (2-acetoxybenzoic acid) is better known as aspirin in the United States—a generic term. In Canada, however, Aspirin, with an uppercase A, is still a trademark of the German company Bayer, while aspirin, with a lowercase "a", is not. Bayer lost the trademark in the United States, the UK and France after World War I, as part of the Treaty of Versailles. So many copycat products entered the marketplace during the war that it was deemed generic just three years later.

Informal uses of trademarks are not covered by trademark protection. For example, Hormel, producer of the canned meat product Spam, does not object to informal use of the word "spam" in reference to unsolicited commercial email. However, it has fought attempts by other companies to register names including the word 'spam' as a trademark in relation to computer products, despite that Hormel's trademark is only registered in reference to food products (a trademark claim is made within a particular field). Such defences have failed in the United Kingdom.

== Public Domain Day ==
An English logo of the 2026/2027 Public Domain Day

Public Domain Day is an observance of when copyrights expire and works enter into the public domain. This legal transition of copyright works into the public domain usually happens every year on 1 January based on the individual copyright laws of each country.

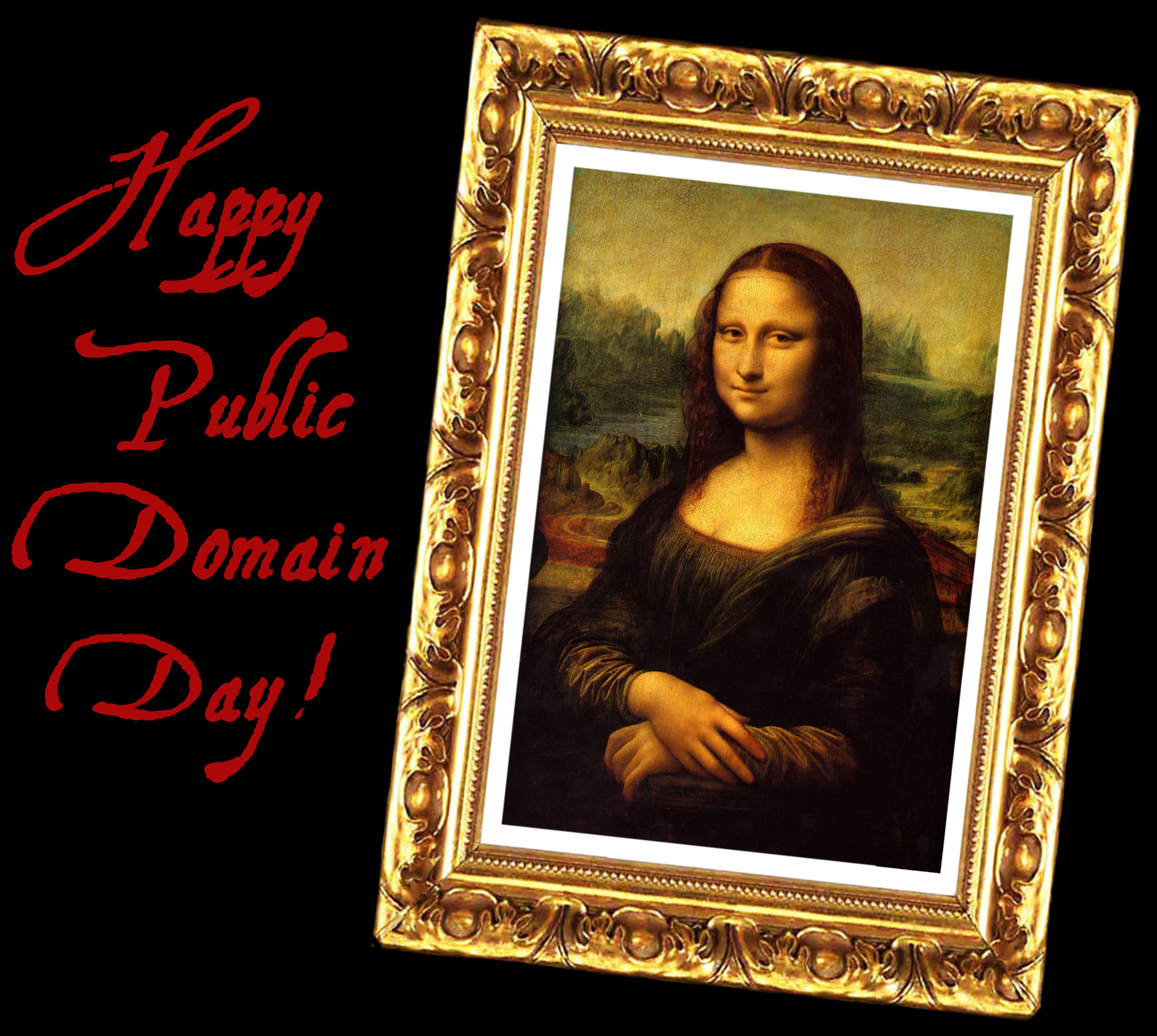
Visual created for Public Domain Day. Features Leonardo da Vinci's Mona Lisa, as it is famously part of the public domain

The observance of a "Public Domain Day" was initially informal; the earliest known mention was in 2004 by Wallace McLean (a Canadian public domain activist), with support for the idea echoed by Lawrence Lessig. As of 1 January 2010, there is as Public Domain Day website which lists authors whose works are entering the public domain. There are activities in countries around the world by various organizations all under the banner Public Domain Day.

== See also ==
- Public Domain Mark
- Public records
- Center for the Study of the Public Domain
- Copyfraud
- Copyleft
- Copyright status of works by the federal government of the United States
- Copyright Term Extension Act
- Eldred v. Ashcroft
- Fair dealing
- Free-culture movement
- Free software
- Freedom of panorama
- Limitations and exceptions to copyright
- List of copyright terms of countries
- List of films in the public domain in the United States
- List of public domain projects
- Millar v Taylor
- Orphan works
- Paying public domain
- Protection of Classics
- Public Domain Enhancement Act
- Public domain image resources
- Public domain in the United States
- Public domain software
- Rule of the shorter term

== Works cited ==
- Huang, Hui (2009). "On public domain in copyright law". Frontiers of Law in China. 4 (2): 178–195. doi:10.1007/s11463-009-0011-6. S2CID 153766621 – via Springer.
- Ronan, Deazley (2006). Rethinking copyright: history, theory, language. Edward Elgar Publishing. p. 102. ISBN 978-1-84542-282-0. Archived from the original on 19 November 2011 – via Google Books.
- Torremans, Paul, ed. (2007). Copyright Law: A Handbook of Contemporary Research. Research handbooks in intellectual property. Cheltenham, UK; Northampton, MA: Edward Elgar Publishing. ISBN 978-1-84844-021-0 – via Google Books.
