= List of things named after Carl Friedrich Gauss =

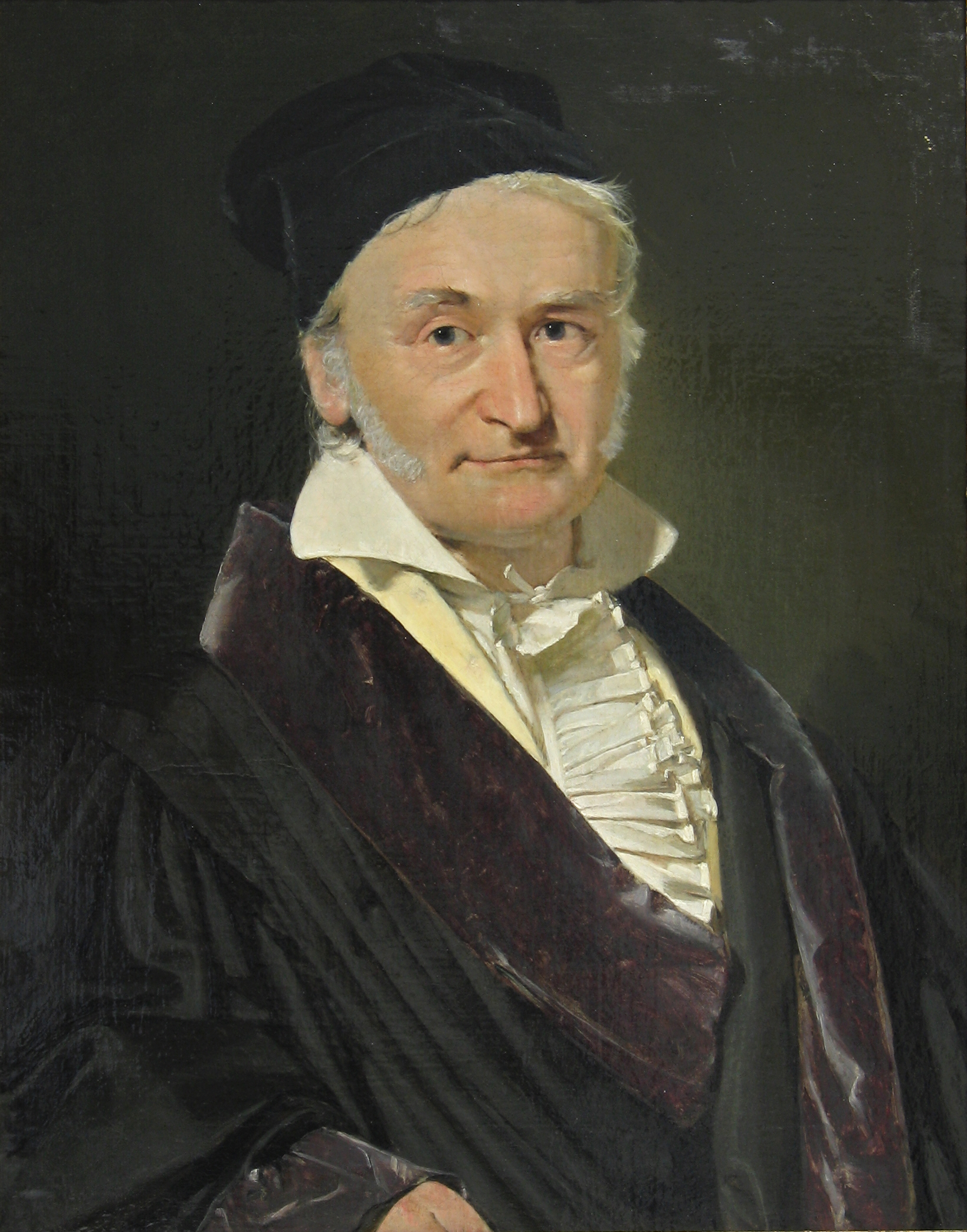
Carl Friedrich Gauss (1777–1855)

Carl Friedrich Gauss (1777–1855) is the eponym of all of the topics listed below. There are over 100 topics all named after this German mathematician and scientist, all in the fields of mathematics, physics, and astronomy. The English eponymous adjective Gaussian is pronounced /ˈɡaʊsiən/.

== Mathematics ==
Various Gaussian curvatures

=== Algebra and linear algebra ===
- Gaussian elimination, also known as row reduction or Gaussian method
- Gauss–Jordan elimination
- Gauss–Seidel method
- Gauss's cyclotomic formula
- Gauss's lemma in relation to polynomials
- Gaussian binomial coefficient, also called Gaussian polynomial or Gaussian coefficient
- Gauss transformation, also called Frobenius matrix

=== Geometry and differential geometry ===
Gauss map

- Gauss–Bodenmiller theorem – described on website of University of Crete
- Gauss–Bolyai–Lobachevsky space, a hyperbolic geometry
- Gauss–Bonnet theorem, a theorem about curvature in differential geometry for 2d surfaces
  - Chern–Gauss–Bonnet theorem in differential geometry, Shiing-Shen Chern's generalization of the above theorem to higher dimensions
- Gauss's braid in braid theory – a four-strand braid
- Gauss–Codazzi equations
- Gauss–Manin connection, a connection on a vector bundle over a family of algebraic varieties
- Gauss–Newton line – described in Journal for Geometry and Graphics, see also Newton line
- Gauss's area formula
- Gauss's lemma in Riemannian geometry
- Gauss map in differential geometry
- Gaussian curvature, defined in his Theorema egregium
- Gauss circle problem

=== Number theory ===
Gaussian moat

- Gauss–Kuzmin–Wirsing constant, a constant in number theory
- Gauss's constant, the reciprocal of the AGM of 1 and $\scriptstyle\sqrt{2}$
- Gauss's digamma theorem, a theorem about the digamma function
- Gauss's generalization of Wilson's theorem
- Gauss's lemma in number theory
- Gauss composition law – described on website of University of Université de Montréal
- Gauss map in number theory
- Gaussian moat
- Gauss class number problem
- Gauss's multiplication formula

==== Cyclotomic fields ====
- Gaussian period
- Gaussian rational
- Gauss sum, an exponential sum over Dirichlet characters
  - Elliptic Gauss sum, an analog of a Gauss sum
  - Quadratic Gauss sum

=== Analysis, numerical analysis, vector calculus and calculus of variations ===
Comparison between 2-point Gaussian and trapezoidal quadrature.

- Gaussian quadrature
- Gauss–Hermite quadrature
- Gauss–Jacobi quadrature
- Gauss–Kronrod quadrature formula
- Gauss–Newton algorithm
- Gauss–Legendre algorithm
- Gauss's complex multiplication algorithm
- Gauss's theorem may refer to the divergence theorem, which is also known as the Ostrogradsky–Gauss theorem
- Gauss pseudospectral method
- Gauss transform, also known as Weierstrass transform.

==== Complex analysis and convex analysis ====
- Gauss–Lucas theorem
- Gauss's continued fraction, an analytic continued fraction derived from the hypergeometric functions
- Gauss's criterion – described on Encyclopedia of Mathematics
- Gauss's hypergeometric theorem, an identity on hypergeometric series
- Gauss plane

=== Statistics ===
Gaussian copula

- Gauss–Kuzmin distribution, a discrete probability distribution
- Gauss–Markov process
- Gauss–Markov theorem
- Gaussian copula
- Gaussian measure
  - Gaussian correlation inequality
  - Gaussian isoperimetric inequality
- Gauss's inequality
- Gauss-Helmert model

==== Gaussian function and topics named for it ====
Gaussian curve with a 2-dimensional domain

- The normal distribution, also known as the Gaussian distribution, the most common bell curve in statistics
- The Gaussian function, the function used in the normal distribution, but also used elsewhere
- The exponentially modified Gaussian distribution or function, used for description of peak shape in many techniques
- Gauss error function
- Gaussian process
- Gaussian filter
- Gauss iterated map (dynamical systems)
- Additive white Gaussian noise
- Gaussian beam
- Gaussian blur, a technique in image processing
- Gaussian fixed point
- Gaussian random field
  - Gaussian free field
- Gaussian integral
- Gaussian variogram model
- Gaussian mixture model
- Gaussian network model
- Gaussian noise
- Gaussian smoothing
- Gaussian splatting
- The inverse Gaussian distribution, also known as the Wald distribution

=== Knot theory ===
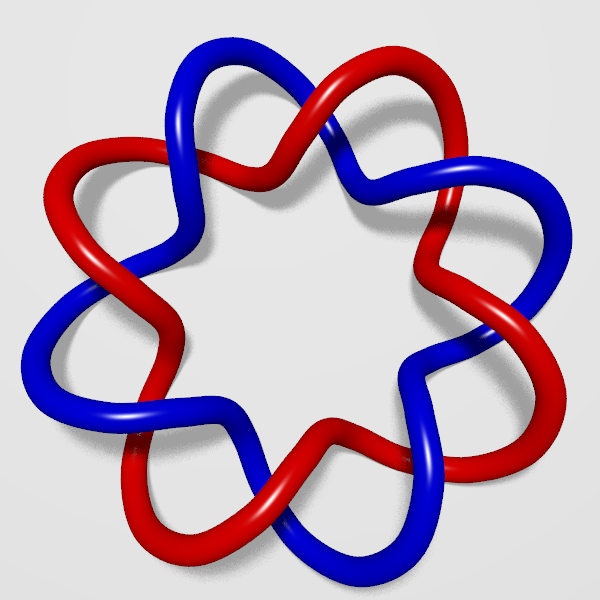
Linking integral

- Gauss code – described on website of University of Toronto
- Gauss linking integral (knot theory)

=== Other mathematical areas ===
- Gauss's algorithm for determination of the day of the week
- Gauss's Easter algorithm
- Gaussian brackets – described on WolframMathWorld
- Gaussian's modular arithmetic
- Gaussian integer, usually written as Z[i]

- Gaussian prime

- Gaussian logarithms (also known as addition and subtraction logarithms)
- Gauss congruence for integer sequences

== Cartography ==
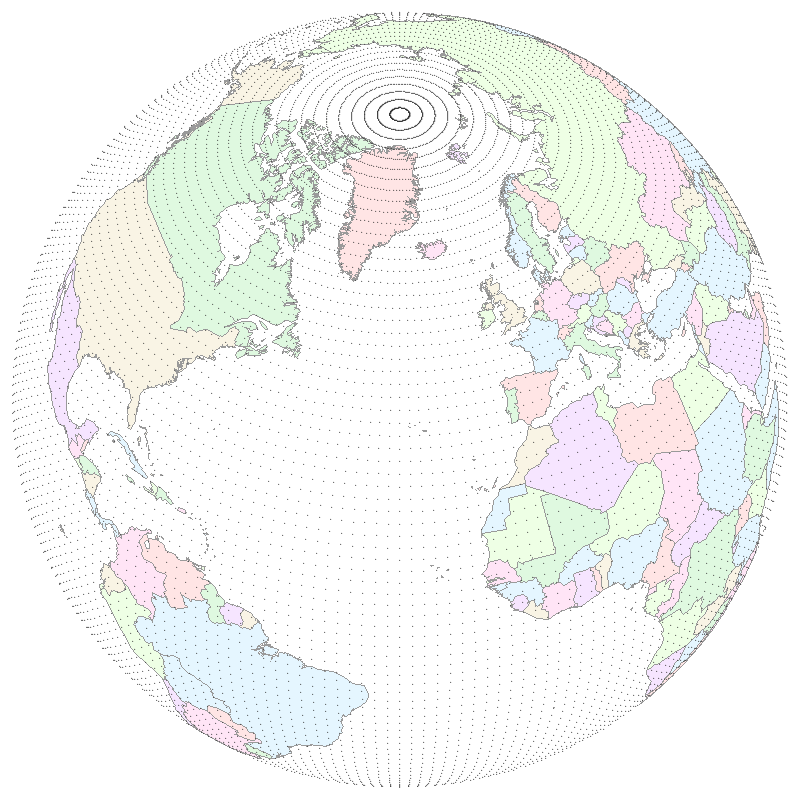
Gaussian grid points

- Gauss–Krüger coordinate system
- Gaussian grid

== Physics ==
=== Optics ===
- Gauss lens
- Double-Gauss lens
- Gaussian optics

=== Classical mechanics ===
- Gauss's principle of least constraint
- For orbit determination in orbital mechanics:
  - Gauss's law for gravity
  - Gaussian gravitational constant
  - Gaussian year
  - Gauss's method

=== Quantum mechanics ===
- Gaussian orbital

=== Electromagnetism ===
Gauss rifle

- Gaussian units
- gauss, the CGS unit for magnetic flux density
- Degaussing, to demagnetize an object
- Gauss's law for magnetism
- Gaussian surface
  - Gauss's law, giving the relationship between flux through a closed surface and the enclosed source
- Gauss gun

== Awards and recognitions ==
- Carl Friedrich Gauss Prize, a mathematics award
- Gauss Lectureship, a mathematical distinction
- The Gauss Mathematics Competition in Canadian junior high schools, an annual national mathematics competition administered by the Centre for Education in Mathematics and Computing

== Other things named for him ==
=== Biology ===
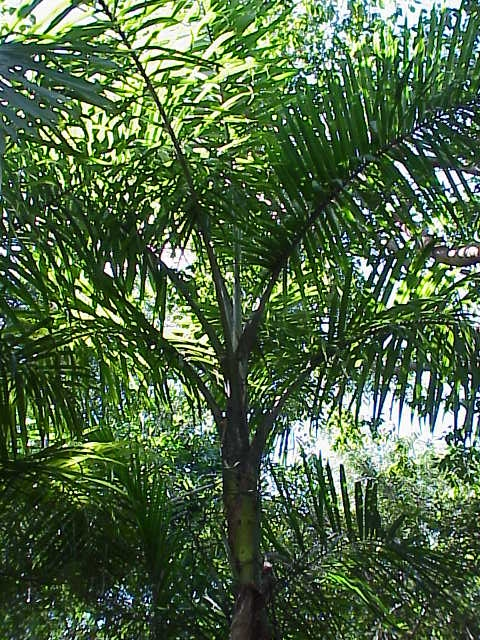
Gaussia maya

- Gaussia, a palm genus described by Hermann Wendland with the then new species Gaussia princeps, collected by Charles Wright in western Cuba. Named in "memoriam astronomi Caroli Friderici Gauss".
- Gaussia, a genus of copepods

=== Informatics ===
- Gaussian, a computational chemistry software program
- GAUSS, a matrix programming language for mathematics and statistics

== Place names and expedition named in his honour ==
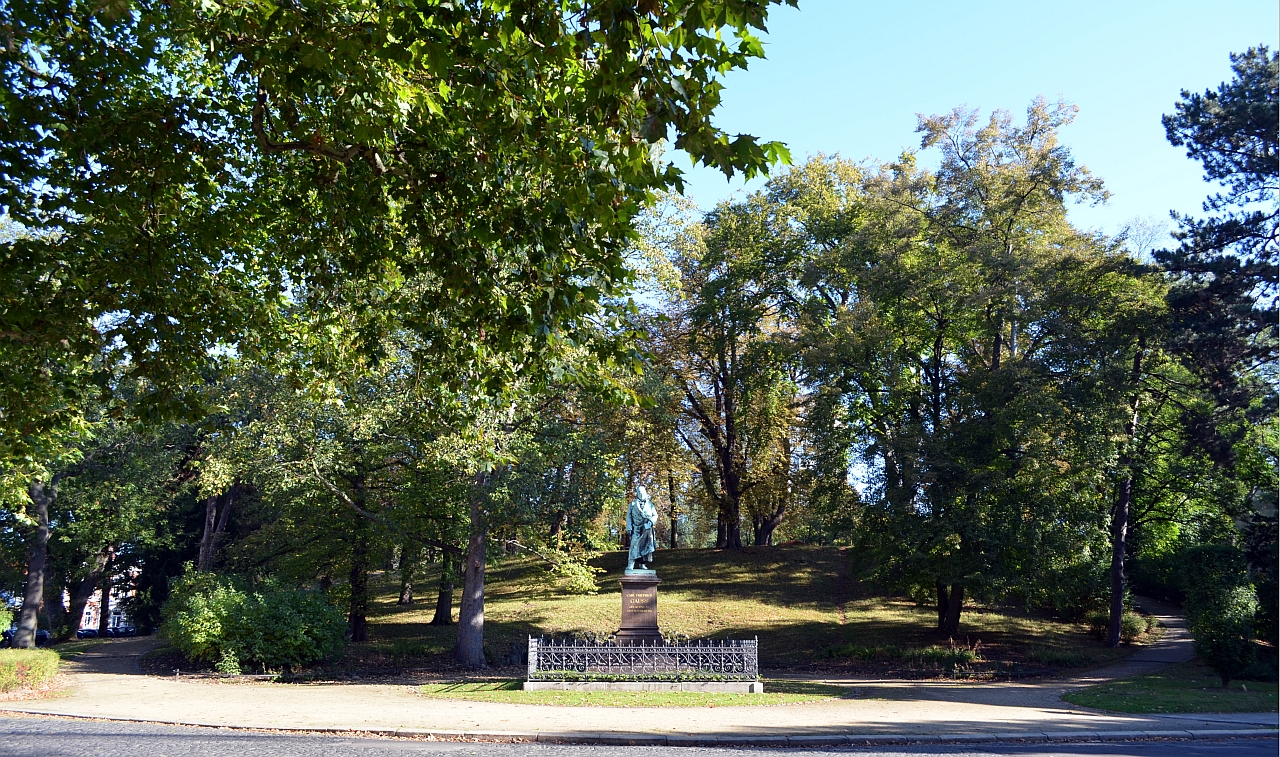
The Gaussberg in Braunschweig, Germany with the Gauss memorial in front

Terrestrial

- The Gauss expedition, the first German expedition to Antarctica (1901–1903)
  - The ship Gauss, used in the Gauss expedition to the Antarctic
- Gaussberg in Antarctica, an extinct volcano discovered by the Gauss expedition
- Mount Gauss, in Antarctica
- Gauss Peninsula, East Greenland
- Gaussberg, a hill in Braunschweig

Celestial

- Crater Gauss on the Moon
- Asteroid 1001 Gaussia

== Institutions and buildings named in his honour ==
- The Carl-Friedrich-Gauss Fakultät of Braunschweig University of Technology
- Several schools in Germany named after Gauss
- Several buildings named "Gauss Haus" or "Gauss Building":
  - Gauss Tower, an observation tower in Dransfeld, Germany
  - The Gauss Building at the University of Idaho (College of Engineering)
  - Gauss Haus, an NMR center at the University of Utah
  - The 'Gauss House', a common room in the University of Sussex Mathematical and Physical Sciences department.
  - A dormitory building is named after him in University of California, Santa Cruz, in Crown College

== Monuments, busts, and memorial plaques ==
Gauss Monuments were erected in Brunswick and Göttingen (the last together with Weber). Busts of Gauss were placed in the Walhalla hall of fame near Regensburg and in the German Research Centre for Geosciences in Potsdam. Several places where Gauss has stayed in Germany are marked with plaques.

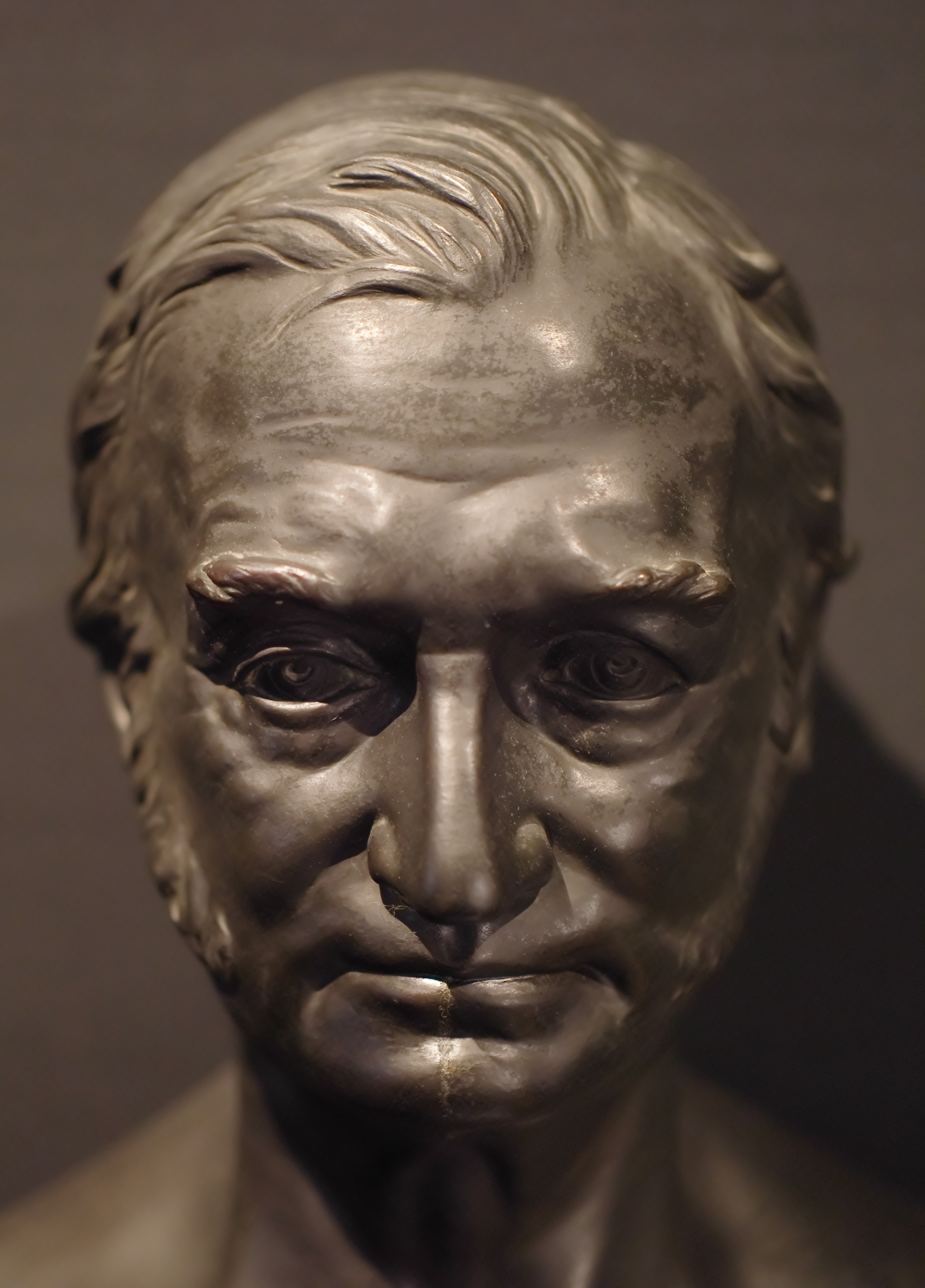
Bust by Hans Weddo von Glümer (1895) in the German Research Centre for Geosciences in Potsdam

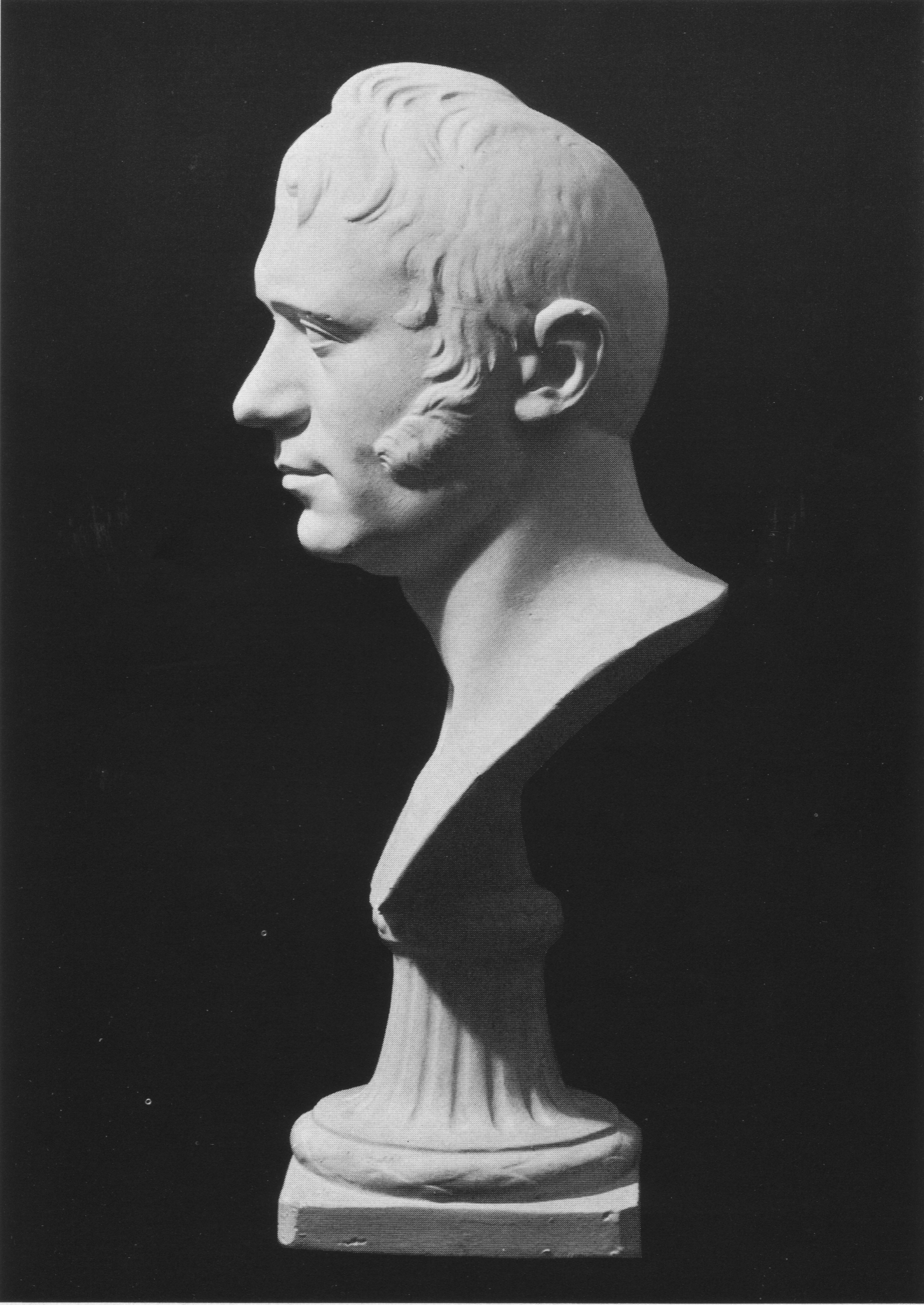
Bust by Friedrich Künkler (1810)

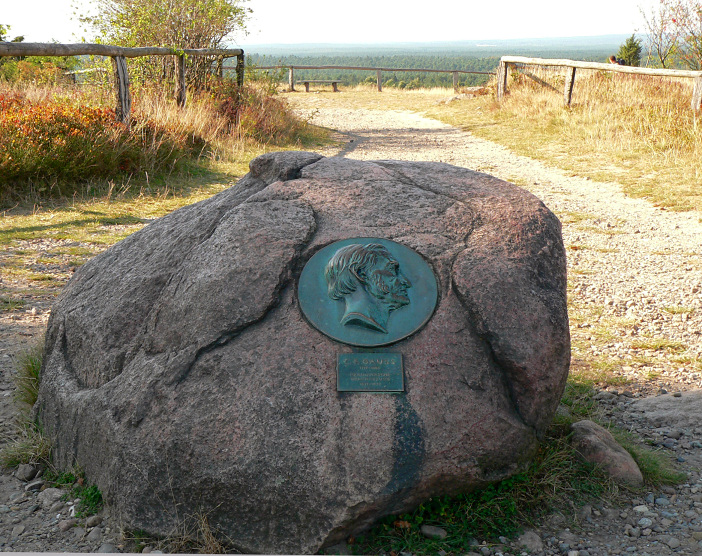
Gauss memorial on the Wilseder Berg, highest point in the Luneburg Heath

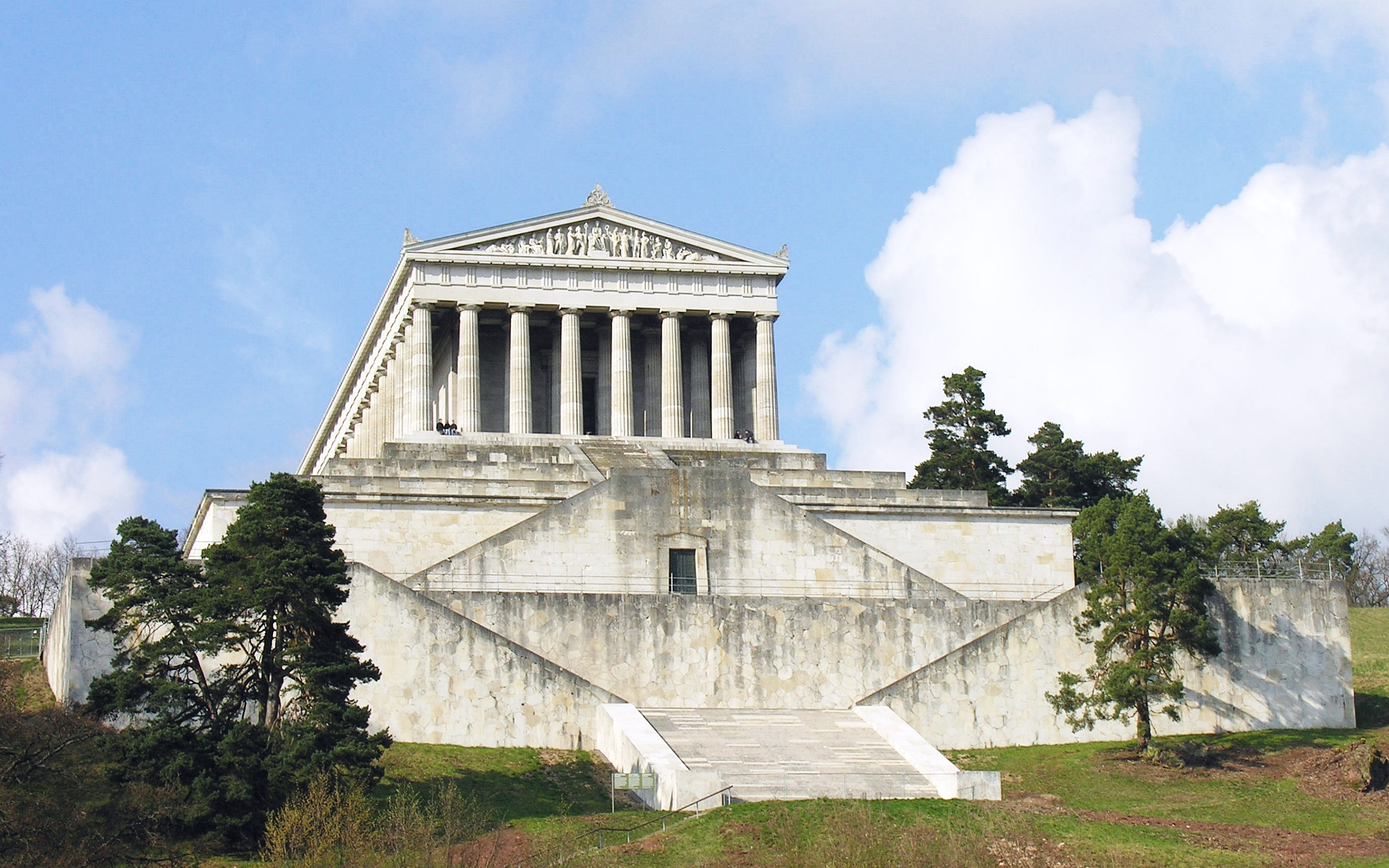
A bust of Gauss is placed in the Walhalla since 2007

== Other commemorations ==
Germany issued three postage stamps honoring Gauss, one in 1955 on the hundredth anniversary of his death and two others in 1977, the 200th anniversary of his birth.

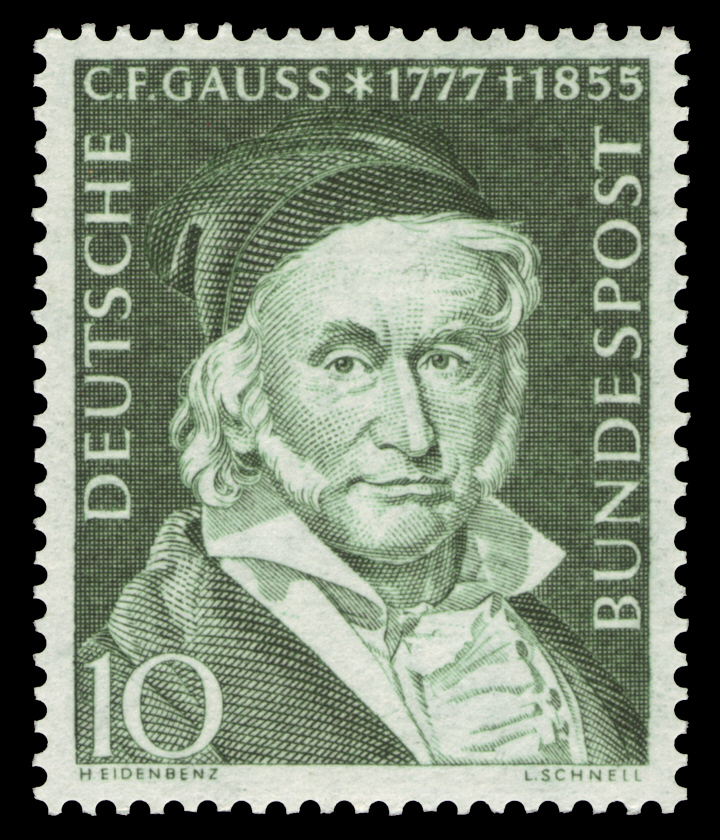
Stamp (West Germany) 1955

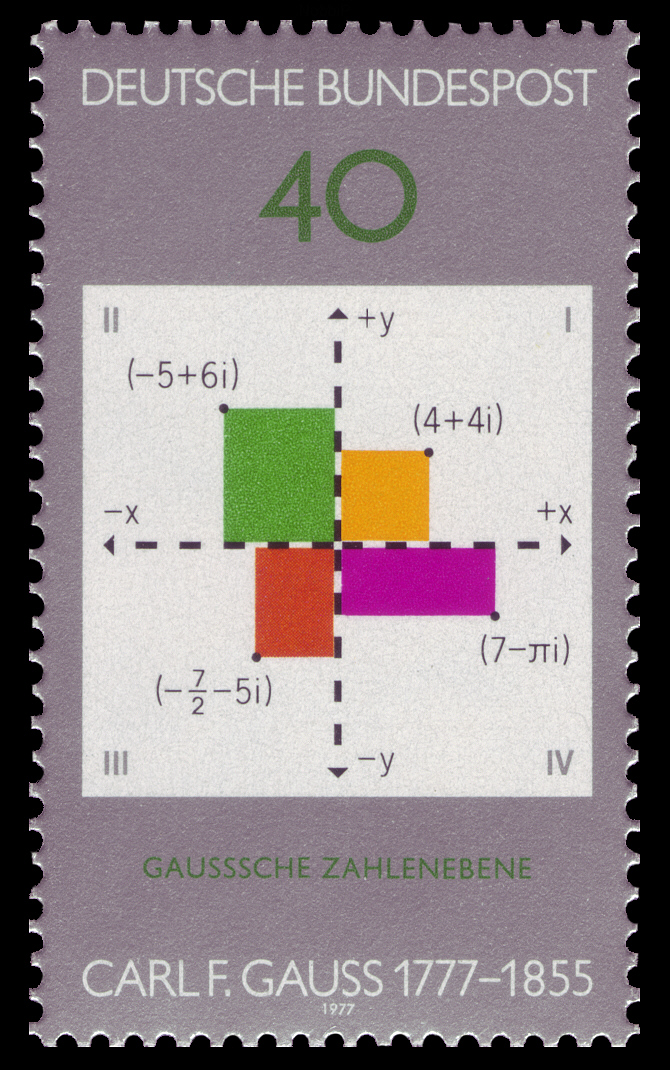
Stamp (West Germany) 1977

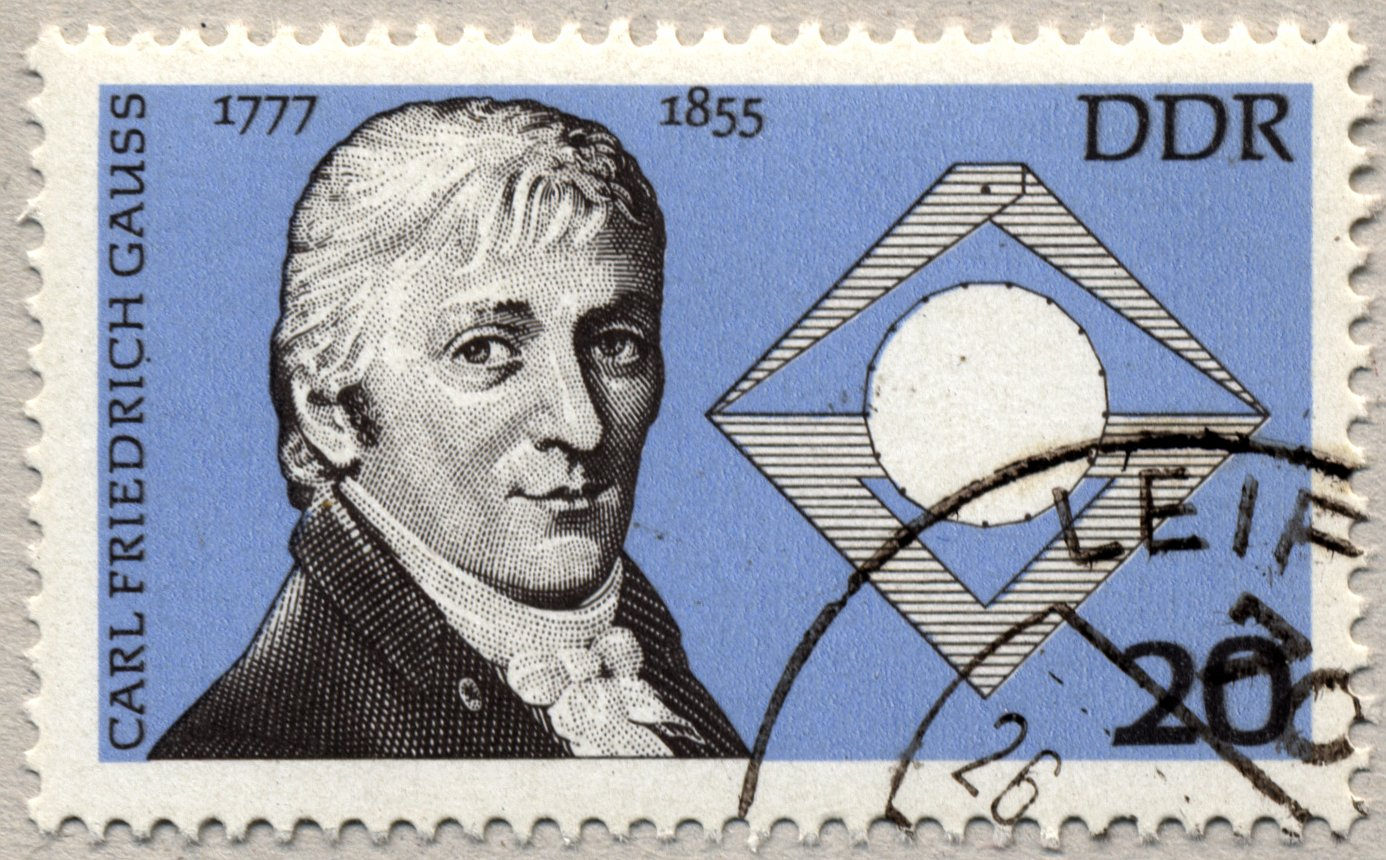
Stamp (East Germany) 1977

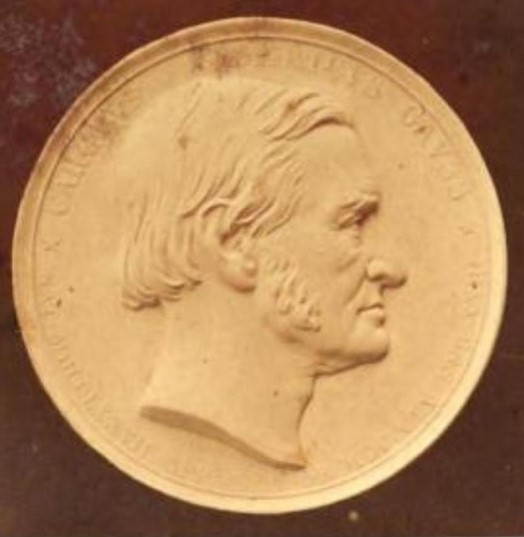
Medal for Gauss (1856, front)

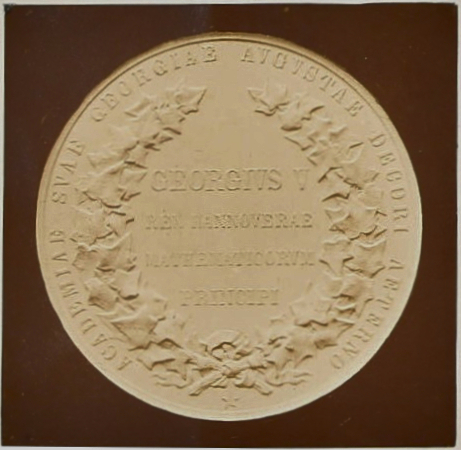
Medal for Gauss (1856, back) "mathematicorum principi"
