= Gauss map (disambiguation) =

Gauss map may refer to:

- The Gauss map, a mapping of the Euclidean space onto a sphere
- The Gauss iterated map, an iterated nonlinear map
- The function $h(x)=1/x-\lfloor1/x\rfloor,$ see Gauss–Kuzmin–Wirsing operator

See also List of topics named after Carl Friedrich Gauss.
