= Newton's theorem =

Newton's theorem may refer to:

- Newton's theorem (quadrilateral)
- Newton's theorem about ovals
- Newton's theorem of revolving orbits
- Newton's shell theorem
