= Gauss–Jacobi quadrature =

In numerical analysis, Gauss–Jacobi quadrature (named after Carl Friedrich Gauss and Carl Gustav Jacob Jacobi) is a method of numerical quadrature based on Gaussian quadrature. Gauss–Jacobi quadrature can be used to approximate integrals of the form

$$\int_{-1}^1 f(x) (1 - x)^\alpha (1 + x)^\beta \,dx$$

where ƒ is a smooth function on [−1, 1] and α, β > −1. The interval [−1, 1] can be replaced by any other interval by a linear transformation. Thus, Gauss–Jacobi quadrature can be used to approximate integrals with singularities at the end points. Gauss–Legendre quadrature is a special case of Gauss–Jacobi quadrature with α = β = 0. Similarly, the Chebyshev–Gauss quadrature of the first (second) kind arises when one takes α = β = −0.5 (+0.5). More generally, the special case α = β turns Jacobi polynomials into Gegenbauer polynomials, in which case the technique is sometimes called Gauss–Gegenbauer quadrature.

Gauss–Jacobi quadrature uses ω(x) = (1 − x)^{α} (1 + x)^{β} as the weight function. The corresponding sequence of orthogonal polynomials consist of Jacobi polynomials. Thus, the Gauss–Jacobi quadrature rule on n points has the form

$$\int_{-1}^1 f(x) (1 - x)^\alpha (1 + x)^\beta \,dx \approx \lambda_1 f(x_1) + \lambda_2 f(x_2) + \ldots + \lambda_n f(x_n),$$

where x_{1}, …, x_{n} are the roots of the Jacobi polynomial of degree n. The weights λ_{1}, …, λ_{n} are given by the formula

$$\lambda_i =
-\frac{2n + \alpha + \beta + 2}
{n + \alpha + \beta + 1}\,
\frac{\Gamma(n + \alpha + 1)\Gamma(n + \beta + 1)}
{\Gamma(n + \alpha + \beta + 1)(n + 1)!}\,
\frac{2^{\alpha + \beta}}
{P_{n}^{(\alpha,\beta)\,\prime}(x_i) P_{n+1}^{(\alpha,\beta)}(x_i)},$$

where Γ denotes the Gamma function and P^{(α, β)}_{n}(x) the Jacobi polynomial of degree n.

The error term (difference between approximate and accurate value) is:

$$E_n = \frac{\Gamma(n+\alpha+1) \Gamma(n+\beta+1) \Gamma(n+\alpha+\beta+1)}{(2n+\alpha+\beta+1)[\Gamma(2n+\alpha+\beta+1)]^2}
\frac{2^{2+\alpha+\beta+1}}{(2n)!} f^{(2n)}(\xi),$$

where $-1 < \xi < 1$.
