= Ruth Mickey =

American statistician (born 1954)

Ruth Mary Mickey (born 1954) is a retired American statistician known for her research on feature selection to control the effects of confounding on statistical inference, and on the applications of statistics to issues of public health and natural resources. She is a professor emerita in the University of Vermont Department of Mathematics & Statistics.

== Education ==
Mickey earned a master's degree in public health at the University of California, Los Angeles (UCLA) in 1978, and completed a Ph.D. in biostatistics at UCLA in 1983.

== Books ==
Mickey is the coauthor of textbooks in statistics including:

- Applied Statistics: Analysis of Variance and Regression (with Olive Jean Dunn and Virginia A. Clark, Wiley, 3rd ed., 2004)
- Bayesian Statistics for Beginners: A Step-by-Step Approach (with Therese M. Donovan, Oxford University Press, 2019)
