= Virginia A. Clark =

American statistician (1928–2018)

Virginia Ann Clark
- Born: 1928; Grand Rapids, Michigan, U.S.
- Died: January 24, 2018 (aged 89–90); Sequim, Washington, U.S.
- Education: University of Michigan; Harvard University; University of California, Los Angeles
- Scientific career
- Fields: Statistician; educator
- Workplaces: U.S. Atomic Energy Commission; University of California, Los Angeles

Virginia Ann Clark (née Leader, 1928–2018) was an American statistician, professor emeritus of biostatistics at the University of California, Los Angeles, and the coauthor of several books on statistics.

== Life ==
Clark was born in 1928, in Grand Rapids, Michigan. After earning a bachelor's degree in mathematics from the University of Michigan in 1950, she began working for the United States Atomic Energy Commission in Hanford, Washington. She studied the biostatistics of birth control at Harvard University in the late 1950s, earning a master's degree, and then completing a doctorate in biomedical statistics at the University of California, Los Angeles.

She became a faculty member at the University of California, Los Angeles, and retired in the 1980s to become an emeritus professor of biostatistics. After retirement she and her husband lived in Sequim, Washington, where she died on January 24, 2018.

== Books ==
Clark is the coauthor of:

- Applied Statistics: Analysis of Variance and Regression (with Olive Jean Dunn, 1974; 3rd ed. with Ruth Mickey, 2004)
- Survival Distributions: Reliability Applications in the Biomedical Sciences (with Alan J. Gross, 1976)
- Computer-Aided Multivariate Analysis (with Abdelmomem Afifi, 1984; 4th ed. with Susanne May, 2004)
- Processing Data: The Survey Example (with Linda B. Bourque, 1992)
- Basic Statistics: A Primer for the Biomedical Sciences (originally by Olive Jean Dunn; 4th ed. with Clark, 2009)
- Practical Multivariate Analysis (with Abdelmomem Afifi and Susanne May, 5th ed., 2012)

== Recognition ==
Clark became a Fellow of the American Statistical Association in 1974.
