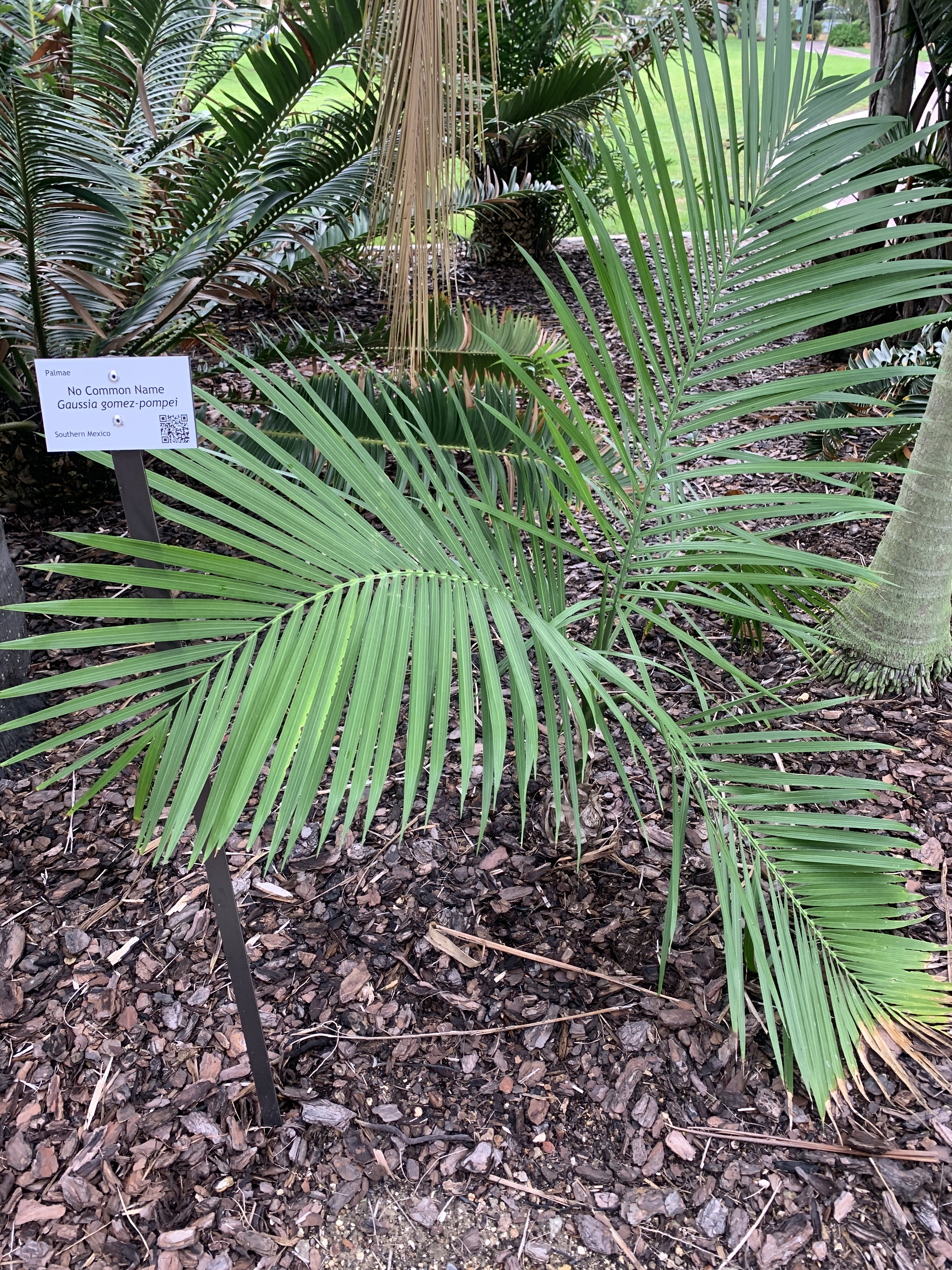

Conservation status
- Vulnerable (IUCN 2.3)

Scientific classification
- Kingdom: Plantae
- Clade: Tracheophytes
- Clade: Angiosperms
- Clade: Monocots
- Clade: Commelinids
- Order: Arecales
- Family: Arecaceae
- Genus: Gaussia
- Species: G. gomez-pompae

Binomial name
- Gaussia gomez-pompae (H.J.Quero) H.J.Quero

Synonyms
- Opsiandra gomez-pompae H.J.Quero

= Gaussia gomez-pompae =

Species of palm

Gaussia gomez-pompae is a palm which is endemic to Mexico. The species grows on steep rocky limestone slopes in Oaxaca, Tabasco and Veracruz states in Mexico.

== Description ==
Gaussia gomez-pompae are 10 to 14 metres tall. Stems are 30 centimetres in diameter. Trees have up to ten pinnately compound leaves. Fruit are orange-red, 1.5 to 1.6 cm in diameter.

The species is classified as vulnerable, and is threatened by habitat destruction and degradation.
