= Thomas Royen =

German statistician

- Born: Thomas Royen; 6 July 1947 (age 79); Frankfurt am Main, Germany
- Citizenship: Germany
- Education: Goethe University Frankfurt; University of Freiburg; Technical University Dortmund (PhD)
- Known for: Proof of Gaussian correlation inequality
- Scientific career
- Fields: Mathematics, Statistics
- Thesis: On Convergence Against Stable Laws (1975)

Thomas Royen (born 6 July 1947) is a retired German professor of statistics who has been affiliated with the University of Applied Sciences Bingen. Royen came to prominence in the spring of 2017 for a relatively simple proof for the Gaussian Correlation Inequality (GCI), a conjecture that originated in the 1950s, which he had published three years earlier without much recognition. A proof of this conjecture, which lies at the intersection of geometry, probability theory and statistics, had eluded top experts for decades.

== Life ==
=== Youth, studies and private life ===
Royen was born in 1947 to Paul Royen, a professor with the institute for inorganic chemistry at the Goethe University Frankfurt and Elisabeth Royen, also a chemist. From 1966 to 1971, he studied mathematics and physics at his father's university and the University of Freiburg. After graduating, he worked as a tutor at the University of Freiburg, before transferring to the Technical University of Dortmund for his doctoral thesis. After attaining his PhD in 1975 with a thesis called Über die Konvergenz gegen stabile Gesetze (On Convergence Against Stable Laws), he worked as a Wissenschaftlicher Assistent at Dortmund University's institute for statistics.

=== Career ===
In 1977, Royen started working as a statistician for the pharmaceutical company Hoechst AG. From 1979 to 1985, he worked at the company's own educational facility teaching mathematics and statistics. Starting in 1985 until becoming an emeritus in 2010, he taught statistics and mathematics at the University of Applied Sciences Bingen in Rhineland-Palatinate.

Royen worked mainly on probability distributions, in particular multivariate chi-squares and gamma distributions, to improve some frequently used statistical test procedures. Nearly half of his circa 30 publications were written when he was aged over sixty. Because he was annoyed over some contradictory reviews and in a few cases also over the incompetence of a referee, he decided in his later years, when his actions had no influence anymore on his further career, to publish his papers on the online platform arXiv.org and sometimes in a less renowned Indian journal to fulfill, at least formally, the condition of a peer review.

=== Proof of the Gaussian correlation inequality ===
On 17 July 2014, a few years after his retirement, when brushing his teeth, Royen had a flash of insight: how to use the Laplace transform of the multivariate gamma distribution to achieve a relatively simple proof for the Gaussian correlation inequality, a conjecture on the intersection of geometry, probability theory and statistics, formulated after work by Dunnett and Sobel (1955) and the American statistician Olive Jean Dunn (1958), that had remained unsolved since then. He sent a copy of his proof to Donald Richards, an acquainted American mathematician, who had worked on a proof of the GCI for 30 years. Richards immediately saw the validity of Royen's proof and subsequently helped him to transform the mathematical formulas into LaTeX. When Royen contacted other reputed mathematicians, though, they didn't bother to investigate his proof, because Royen was relatively unknown, and these mathematicians therefore estimated the chance that Royen's proof would be false as very high.

Royen published this proof in an article with the title A simple proof of the Gaussian correlation conjecture extended to multivariate gamma distributions on arXiv and subsequently in the Far East Journal of Theoretical Statistics, a relatively unknown periodical based in Allahabad, India, for which Royen was at the time voluntarily working as a referee himself. Due to this, his proof went at first largely unnoticed by the scientific community, until in late 2015 two Polish mathematicians, Rafał Latała and Dariusz Matlak, wrote a paper in which they reorganized Royen's proof in a way that was intended to be easier to follow. In July 2015, Royen supplemented his proof with a further paper in arXiv Some probability inequalities for multivariate gamma and normal distributions.

A 2017 article by Natalie Wolchover about Royen's proof in Quanta Magazine resulted in greater academic and public recognition for his achievement.
