= Olive Jean Dunn =

American mathematician (1915–2008)

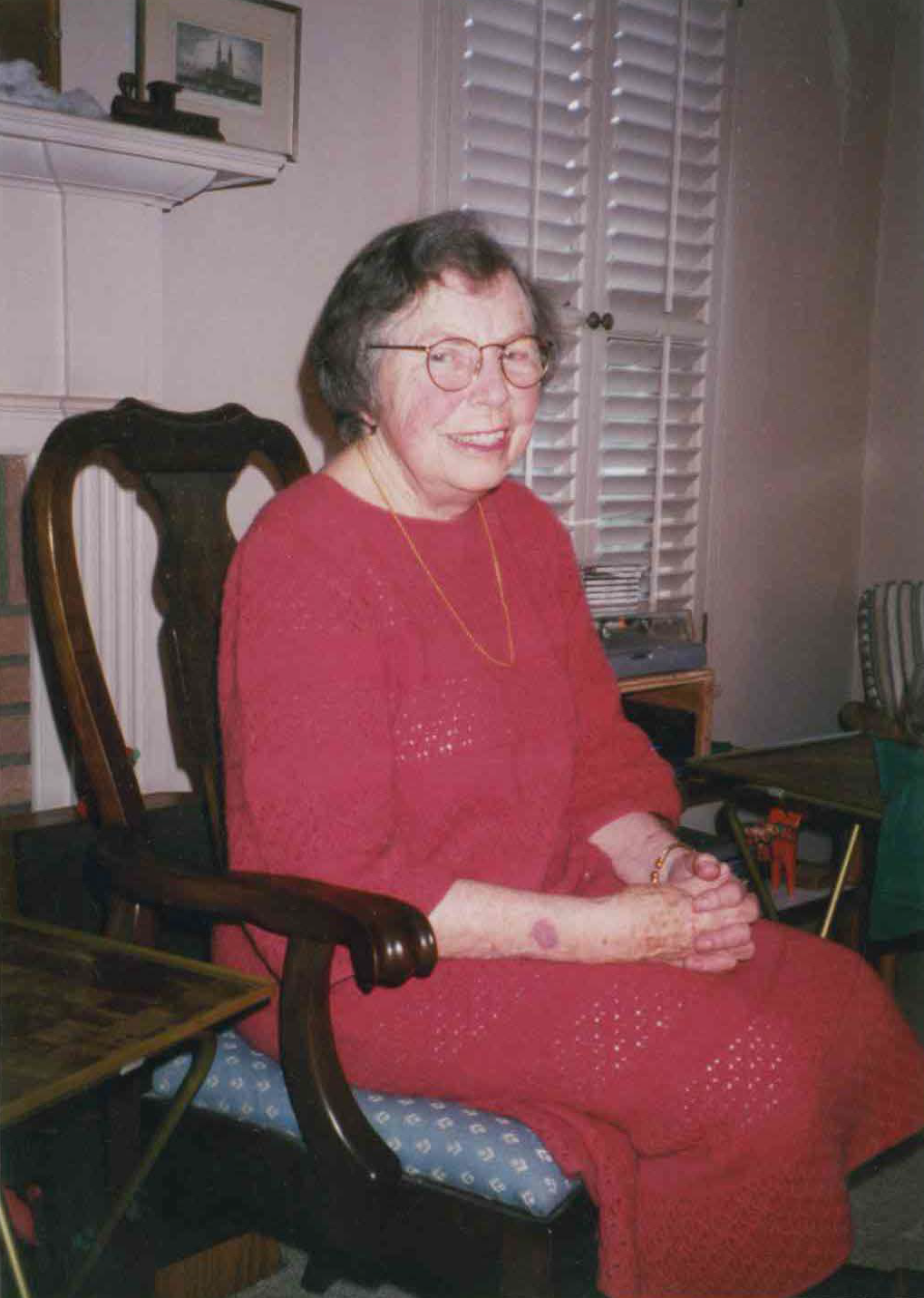
- Olive Jean Dunn in 1998
- Born: 1 September 1915
- Died: 12 January 2008 (aged 92)
- Education: University of California Los Angeles
- Known for: Developing methods of correcting for multiple testing; Basic Statistics: A Primer for the Biomedical Sciences
- Scientific career
- Fields: Mathematics; Statistics
- Workplaces: Iowa State College; University of California Los Angeles
- Thesis: Estimation problems for dependent regression (1956)

Olive Jean Dunn (1 September 1915 – 12 January 2008) was an American mathematician and statistician, and professor of biostatistics at the University of California Los Angeles (UCLA). She described methods for computing confidence intervals and also codified the Bonferroni correction's application to confidence intervals. She authored the textbook Basic Statistics: A Primer for the Biomedical Sciences in 1977.

== Education and career ==
Dunn studied mathematics at the UCLA, earning a BA in 1936 and an MA in 1951. She was awarded a PhD in mathematics in 1956 at UCLA, supervised by Paul G. Hoel.

The title of Dunn's doctoral dissertation was Estimation problems for dependent regression.

In 1956, she was appointed assistant professor of statistics at Iowa State College. Dunn returned to UCLA in 1959 as assistant professor of biostatistics and assistant professor of preventive medicine and health, later becoming full professor and serving in that role until her retirement. Dunn served on the editorial boards of several journals.

== Contributions to statistical methods and textbooks ==
Some of Dunn's 1958 and 1959 work led to the conjecture of the Gaussian correlation inequality, which was only proved by German mathematician Thomas Royen in 2014 and was only widely recognized as proved in 2017.

Dunn's doctoral dissertation work formed the basis for her continuing development of methods for confidence intervals in biostatistics, and the development of a method for correcting for multiple testing. From the notes to her 1959 publication on confidence intervals:

"Most of the research for this paper was part of my doctoral dissertation. The idea of writing an article for the research worker who uses statistical methods was suggested to me by one of the non-statisticians on my doctoral committee at the time of my final examination. In working on the various confidence intervals for k means, I thought of the Bonferroni inequality ones quite early, but since they were so simple I thought they couldn't possibly be of any use. I spent a long time trying to prove that the confidence intervals which would be used in the case of independent variables could also be used or dependent variables. After failing to find a general proof for this, I finally noticed that the simple Bonferroni intervals were nearly as short."

The first edition of her textbook, Basic statistics: a primer for the biomedical sciences, was published in 1964 Later editions were co-authored with another professor from UCLA, Virginia A. Clark. Dunn and Clark also co-authored Applied statistics: an analysis of variance and regression, which has also had several editions, with Ruth Mickey joining the authors.

== Honors ==
Dunn became a Fellow of the American Statistical Association in 1968. She was also a fellow of the American Association for the Advancement of Science (AAAS) and the American Public Health Association.

In October 1974, Dunn was honored as the annual UCLA annual Woman of Science, awarded to "an outstanding woman who has made significant contributions in the field of science". She was quoting as saying "I am thrilled to death for myself and for biostatistics...There are few medical centers in the country where a woman in biostatistics would be selected for this honor".
