= Newton's theorem (quadrilateral) =

Geometrical theorem

P lies on the Newton line EF

In Euclidean geometry Newton's theorem states that in every tangential quadrilateral other than a rhombus, the center of the incircle lies on the Newton line.

== Statement ==
Let ABCD be a tangential quadrilateral with at most one pair of parallel sides. Furthermore, let E and F the midpoints of its diagonals AC and BD and P be the center of its incircle. Given such a configuration the point P is located on the Newton line, that is line EF connecting the midpoints of the diagonals.

A tangential quadrilateral with two pairs of parallel sides is a rhombus. In this case, both midpoints and the center of the incircle coincide, and by definition, no Newton line exists.

== Proof ==
Newton's theorem can easily be derived from Anne's theorem considering that in tangential quadrilaterals the combined lengths of opposite sides are equal (Pitot theorem: a + c = b + d). According to Anne's theorem, showing that the combined areas of opposite triangles PAD and PBC and the combined areas of triangles PAB and PCD are equal is sufficient to ensure that P lies on EF. Let r be the radius of the incircle, then r is also the altitude of all four triangles.
$$\begin{align}
A(\triangle PAB) + A(\triangle PCD) &= \frac{1}{2}ra + \frac{1}{2}rc = \frac{1}{2}r(a+c) \\
&= \frac{1}{2}r(b+d) = \frac{1}{2}rb + \frac{1}{2}rd \\
&= A(\triangle PBC) + A(\triangle PAD).
\end{align}$$
