= Gaussia spirituana =

Conservation status
- Endangered (IUCN 3.1)

Scientific classification
- Kingdom: Plantae
- Clade: Tracheophytes
- Clade: Angiosperms
- Clade: Monocots
- Clade: Commelinids
- Order: Arecales
- Family: Arecaceae
- Genus: Gaussia
- Species: G. spirituana

Binomial name
- Gaussia spirituana Moya & Leiva

Species of palm

Gaussia spirituana is a palm which is endemic to the Sierra de Jatibonico in east-central Cuba.

== Description ==
Gaussia spirituana stems are whitish, up to 7 metres tall. Stems are 30–35 centimetres in diameter, swollen at the base and tapering upward. Trees have up to ten pinnately compound leaves. Fruit are orange-red, 1 cm in diameter.

== Conservation ==
The species is considered endangered based on the fact that only 150 individuals are known to exist, and they are fragmented into five subpopulations. They are also threatened by habitat destruction and non-native pathogens.
