= Gauss–Laguerre quadrature =

Mathematical method in numerical analysis

In numerical analysis Gauss–Laguerre quadrature (named after Carl Friedrich Gauss and Edmond Laguerre) is an extension of the Gaussian quadrature method for approximating the value of integrals of the following kind:

$$\int_{0}^{\infty} e^{-x} f(x)\,dx.$$

In this case

$$\int_{0}^{\infty} e^{-x} f(x)\,dx \approx \sum_{i=1}^n w_i f(x_i)$$

where x_{i} is the i-th root of Laguerre polynomial L_{n}(x) and the weight w_{i} is given by

$$w_i = \frac {x_i} {\left(n + 1\right)^2 \left[L_{n+1}\left(x_i\right)\right]^2}.$$

The following Python code with the SymPy library will allow for calculation of the values of $x_i$ and $w_i$ to 20 digits of precision:

from sympy import *

def lag_weights_roots(n):
    x = Symbol("x")
    roots = Poly(laguerre(n, x)).all_roots()
    x_i = [rt.evalf(20) for rt in roots]
    w_i = [(rt / ((n + 1) * laguerre(n + 1, rt)) ** 2).evalf(20) for rt in roots]
    return x_i, w_i

print(lag_weights_roots(5))

or simply :

from sympy.integrals.quadrature import gauss_laguerre

print(gauss_laguerre(5, 20))

== For more general functions ==
To integrate the function $f$ we apply the following transformation

$$\int_{0}^{\infty}f(x)\,dx=\int_{0}^{\infty}f(x)e^{x}e^{-x}\,dx=\int_{0}^{\infty}g(x)e^{-x}\,dx$$

where $g\left(x\right) := e^{x} f\left(x\right)$. For the last integral one then uses Gauss-Laguerre quadrature. Note, that while this approach works from an analytical perspective, it is not always numerically stable.

== Generalized Gauss–Laguerre quadrature ==
More generally, one can also consider integrands that have a known $x^\alpha$ power-law singularity at x=0, for some real number $\alpha > -1$, leading to integrals of the form:

$$\int_{0}^{+\infty} x^\alpha e^{-x} f(x)\,dx.$$

In this case, the weights are given in terms of the generalized Laguerre polynomials:

$$w_i = \frac{\Gamma(n+\alpha+1) x_i}{n!(n+1)^2 [L_{n+1}^{(\alpha)}(x_i)]^2} \,,$$

where $x_i$ are the roots of $L_n^{(\alpha)}$.

This allows one to efficiently evaluate such integrals for polynomial or smooth f(x) even when α is not an integer.
