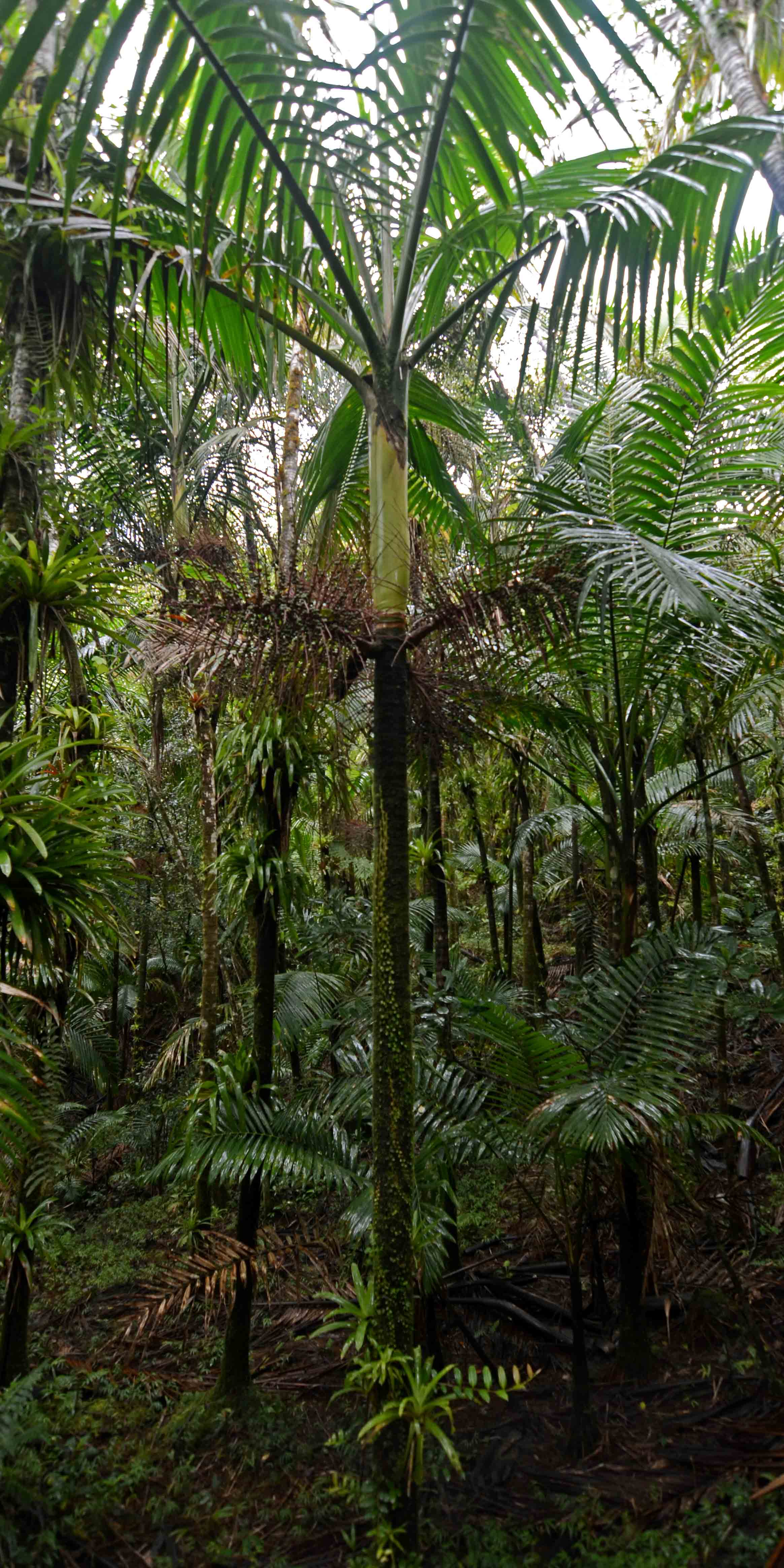
- In El Yunque, Puerto Rico

Conservation status
- Vulnerable (IUCN 3.1)

Scientific classification
- Kingdom: Plantae
- Clade: Tracheophytes
- Clade: Angiosperms
- Clade: Monocots
- Clade: Commelinids
- Order: Arecales
- Family: Arecaceae
- Genus: Gaussia
- Species: G. attenuata

Binomial name
- Gaussia attenuata (O.F.Cook) Becc.

= Gaussia attenuata =

Species of palm

Gaussia attenuata (palma de sierra, llume) is a palm which is native to Puerto Rico and the Dominican Republic. The species grows on steep-sided limestone hills (known as mogotes) in Puerto Rico. It is also native to the eastern Dominican Republic.

== Description ==
Gaussia attenuata trees are up to 15 metres tall with grey stems which are swollen at the base and tapering above. Stems are 15 to 25 centimetres in diameter. Trees have five to seven pinnately compound leaves. Fruit are orange-red, 1.4 to 1.6 cm long and 1.2 cm in diameter, with one to three seeds.
