= Gauss–Hermite quadrature =

Form of Gaussian quadrature

Weights versus x_{i} for four choices of n

In numerical analysis, Gauss–Hermite quadrature is a form of Gaussian quadrature for approximating the value of integrals of the following kind:

$$\int_{-\infty}^{+\infty} e^{-x^2} f(x)\,dx.$$

In this case

$$\int_{-\infty}^{+\infty} e^{-x^2} f(x)\,dx \approx \sum_{i=1}^n w_i f(x_i)$$

where n is the number of sample points used. The x_{i} are the roots of the physicists' version of the Hermite polynomial H_{n}(x) (i = 1,2,...,n), and the associated weights w_{i} are given by

$$w_i = \frac {2^{n-1} n! \sqrt{\pi}} {n^2[H_{n-1}(x_i)]^2}.$$

== Example with change of variable ==
Consider a function h(y), where the variable y is normally distributed: $y \sim \mathcal{N}(\mu,\sigma^2)$. The expectation of h corresponds to the following integral:

$E[h(y)] = \int_{-\infty}^{+\infty} \frac{1}{\sigma \sqrt{2\pi}} \exp \left( -\frac{(y-\mu)^2}{2\sigma^2} \right) h(y) dy$

As this does not exactly correspond to the Hermite polynomial, we need to change variables:

$x = \frac{y-\mu}{\sqrt{2} \sigma} \Leftrightarrow y = \sqrt{2} \sigma x + \mu$

Coupled with the integration by substitution, we obtain:

$E[h(y)] = \int_{-\infty}^{+\infty} \frac{1}{\sqrt{\pi}} \exp(-x^2) h(\sqrt{2} \sigma x + \mu) dx$

leading to:

$E[h(y)] \approx \frac{1}{\sqrt{\pi}} \sum_{i=1}^n w_i h(\sqrt{2} \sigma x_i + \mu)$

As an illustration, in the simplest non-trivial case, with $n = 2$, we have $x_1 = -\frac{1}{\sqrt{2}}, x_2 = \frac{1}{\sqrt{2}}$ and $w_1 = w_2 = \frac{\sqrt{\pi}}{2}$, so the estimate reduces to:

$E[h(y)] \approx \frac{1}{2}(h(\mu - \sigma) + h(\mu + \sigma))$

– i.e. the average of the function's values one standard deviation below and above the mean.
