= Chebyshev–Gauss quadrature =

Mathematical mentod

In numerical analysis Chebyshev–Gauss quadrature is an extension of Gaussian quadrature method for approximating the value of integrals of the following kind:

$$\int_{-1}^{+1} \frac {f(x)} {\sqrt{1 - x^2} }\,dx$$

and

$$\int_{-1}^{+1} \sqrt{1 - x^2} g(x)\,dx.$$

In the first case

$$\int_{-1}^{+1} \frac {f(x)} {\sqrt{1-x^2} }\,dx \approx \sum_{i=1}^n w_i f(x_i)$$

where

$$x_i = \cos \left( \frac {2i-1} {2n} \pi \right)$$

and the weight

$w_i = \frac {\pi} {n}.$

In the second case

$$\int_{-1}^{+1} \sqrt{1-x^2} g(x)\,dx \approx \sum_{i=1}^n w_i g(x_i)$$

where

$$x_i = \cos \left( \frac {i} {n+1} \pi \right)$$

and the weight

$w_i = \frac {\pi} {n+1} \sin^2 \left( \frac {i} {n+1} \pi \right). \,$

== See also ==
- Chebyshev polynomials
- Chebyshev nodes
