= Newton line =

Line between midpoints of 2 diagonals in a 4-sided shape other than a parallelogram

E, K, F lie on a common line, the Newton line

In Euclidean geometry, the Newton line is the line that connects the midpoints of the two diagonals in a convex quadrilateral other than a parallelogram.

== Properties ==
The line segments G̅H̅ and I̅J̅ that connect the midpoints of opposite sides (the bimedians) of a convex quadrilateral intersect in a point that lies on the Newton line. This point K bisects the line segment E̅F̅ that connects the diagonal midpoints.

By Anne's theorem and its converse, any interior point P on the Newton line of a quadrilateral ABCD has the property that

$$[\triangle ABP] + [\triangle CDP] = [\triangle ADP] + [\triangle BCP],$$

where [△ABP] denotes the area of triangle △ABP.

If the quadrilateral is a tangential quadrilateral, then its incenter also lies on this line.

== See also ==
- Complete quadrangle
- Newton's theorem (quadrilateral)
- Newton–Gauss line
