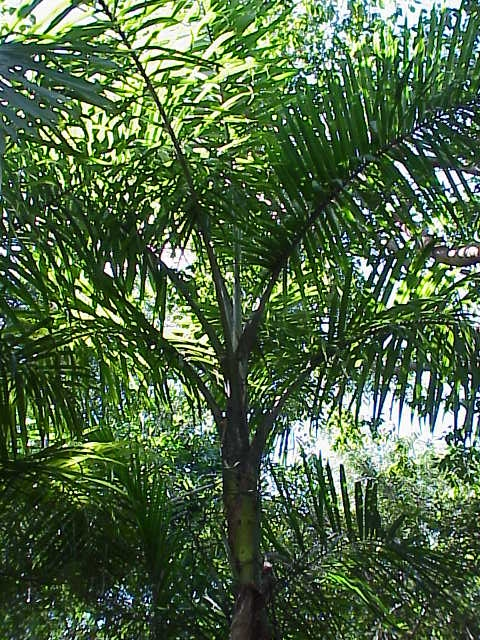

Conservation status
- Vulnerable (IUCN 3.1)

Scientific classification
- Kingdom: Plantae
- Clade: Tracheophytes
- Clade: Angiosperms
- Clade: Monocots
- Clade: Commelinids
- Order: Arecales
- Family: Arecaceae
- Genus: Gaussia
- Species: G. maya

Binomial name
- Gaussia maya (O.F.Cook) H.J.Quero & Read

Synonyms
- Opsiandra maya O.F.Cook

= Gaussia maya =

Species of palm

Gaussia maya is a palm which is native to Mexico, Belize and Guatemala. The species grows in rocky areas on limestone soils. The species is classified as vulnerable, and is threatened by habitat destruction and degradation.

Gaussia maya are 5 to 20 metres tall. Stems are gray, 10 to 15 (sometimes 30) centimetres in diameter. Trees have six to eight pinnately compound leaves. Fruit are red, 1 to 1.5 cm in diameter. Stems are used for construction.
