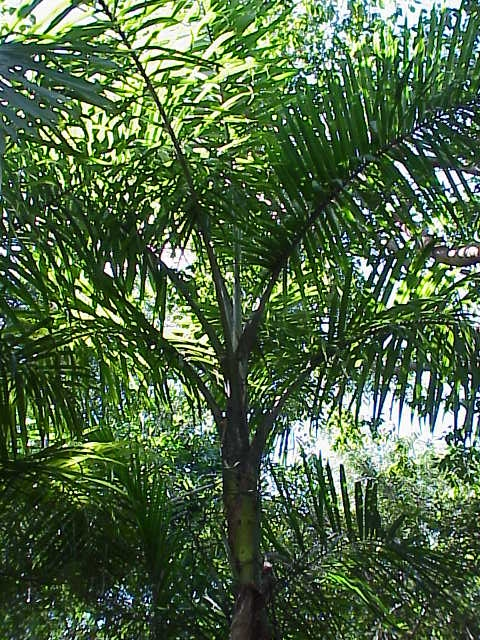
- Gaussia maya

Scientific classification
- Kingdom: Plantae
- Clade: Tracheophytes
- Clade: Angiosperms
- Clade: Monocots
- Clade: Commelinids
- Order: Arecales
- Family: Arecaceae
- Subfamily: Arecoideae
- Tribe: Chamaedoreeae
- Genus: Gaussia; H.Wendl.

Species
- Gaussia attenuata Gaussia gomez-pompae Gaussia maya Gaussia princeps Gaussia spirituana

= Gaussia (plant) =

Genus of palms

Gaussia is a genus in the palm family, native to Mexico, Central America and the Greater Antilles. They are solitary, unarmed, and have pinnately compound leaves. The trees have enlarged bases and prop-roots.

== Taxonomy ==
There are five species in the genus:

- G. attenuata which is found in Puerto Rico
- G. gomez-pompae which is found in the Mexican states of Chiapas, Oaxaca and Veracruz
- G. maya which is found in Mexico, Belize and Guatemala
- G. princeps which is found in western Cuba
- G. spirituana which is found in the Sierra de Jatibonico in east-central Cuba.
