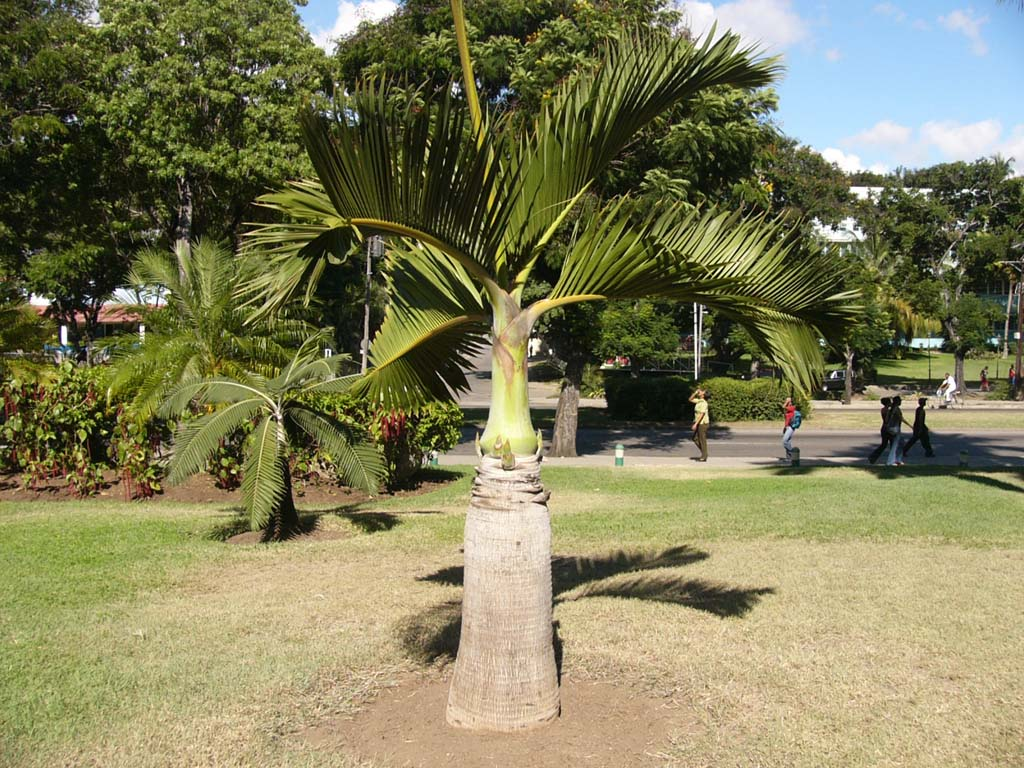

Scientific classification
- Kingdom: Plantae
- Clade: Tracheophytes
- Clade: Angiosperms
- Clade: Monocots
- Clade: Commelinids
- Order: Arecales
- Family: Arecaceae
- Genus: Gaussia
- Species: G. princeps

Binomial name
- Gaussia princeps H.Wendl.

= Gaussia princeps (plant) =

Species of palm

Gaussia princeps, commonly known as palma de sierra, is a palm which is endemic to Cuba. The species grows on steep-sided limestone hills (known as mogotes) in Pinar del Río Province in western Cuba.

== Description ==
This palm grows to a height of 10–15 m and has a whitish, spindle-shaped trunk that swells at the base and tapers toward the top, measuring about 30 cm across at the base. The crown holds three to six pinnate leaves, each bright green and up to 2.5 m long. The inflorescences emerge among the leaves, with flowers supported on sturdy pedicels. The fruits are ellipsoid, roughly 1 cm long and 7 mm wide, orange-red when mature, and contain one to three seeds. While similar in appearance to Roystonea regia, this species can be distinguished by the widening of the trunk at the base and its gradual narrowing toward the top.
