= Newton–Gauss line =

Line joining midpoints of a complete quadrilateral's 3 diagonals

Diagonals Newton-Gauss line through the midpoints L, M, N of the diagonals

In geometry, the Newton–Gauss line (or Gauss–Newton line) is the line joining the midpoints of the three diagonals of a complete quadrilateral.

The midpoints of the two diagonals of a convex quadrilateral with at most two parallel sides are distinct and thus determine a line, the Newton line. If the sides of such a quadrilateral are extended to form a complete quadrangle, the diagonals of the quadrilateral remain diagonals of the complete quadrangle and the Newton line of the quadrilateral is the Newton–Gauss line of the complete quadrangle.

== Complete quadrilaterals ==
Any four lines in general position (no two lines are parallel, and no three are concurrent) form a complete quadrilateral. This configuration consists of a total of six points, the intersection points of the four lines, with three points on each line and precisely two lines through each point. These six points can be split into pairs so that the line segments determined by any pair do not intersect any of the given four lines except at the endpoints. These three line segments are called diagonals of the complete quadrilateral.

=== Existence of the Newton−Gauss line ===
Labels used in proof concerning complete quadrilateral

It is a well-known theorem that the three midpoints of the diagonals of a complete quadrilateral are collinear. There are several proofs of the result based on areas or wedge products or, as the following proof, on Menelaus's theorem, due to Hillyer and published in 1920.

Let the complete quadrilateral ABCA'B'C' be labeled as in the diagram with diagonals A̅A̅', B̅B̅', C̅C̅' and their respective midpoints L, M, N. Let the midpoints of B̅C̅, C̅A̅', A̅'B̅ be P, Q, R respectively. Using similar triangles it is seen that QR intersects A̅A̅' at L, RP intersects B̅B̅' at M and PQ intersects C̅C̅' at N. Again, similar triangles provide the following proportions,
$$\frac{\overline{RL}}{\overline{LQ}} = \frac{\overline{BA}}{\overline{AC}}, \quad \frac{\overline{QN}}{\overline{NP}} = \frac{\overline{A'C'}}{\overline{C'B}}, \quad \frac{\overline{PM}}{\overline{MR}} = \frac{\overline{CB'}}{\overline{B'A'}}.$$
However, the line A'B'C intersects the sides of triangle △ABC, so by Menelaus's theorem the product of the terms on the right hand sides is −1. Thus, the product of the terms on the left hand sides is also −1 and again by Menelaus's theorem, the points L, M, N are collinear on the sides of triangle △PQR.

== Applications to cyclic quadrilaterals ==
The following are some results that use the Newton–Gauss line of complete quadrilaterals that are associated with cyclic quadrilaterals, based on the work of Barbu and Patrascu.

=== Equal angles ===
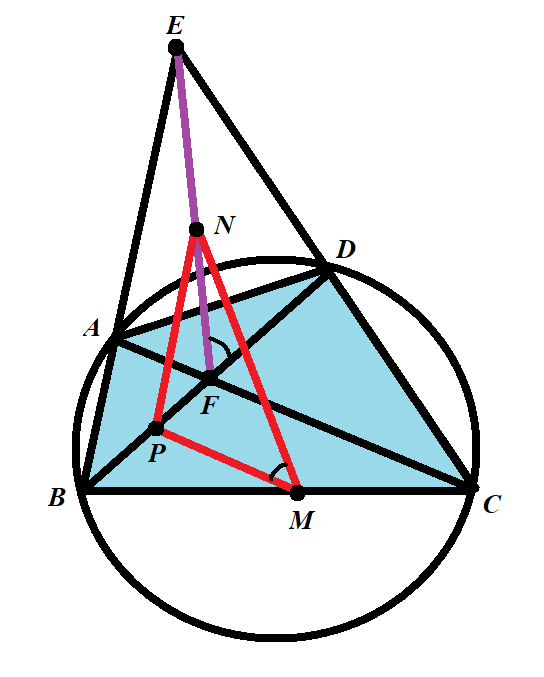
Figure 1: An angle equality.

Given any cyclic quadrilateral ABCD, let point F be the point of intersection between the two diagonals A̅C̅ and B̅D̅. Extend the diagonals A̅B̅ and C̅D̅ until they meet at the point of intersection, E. Let the midpoint of the segment E̅F̅ be N, and let the midpoint of the segment B̅C̅ be M (Figure 1).

==== Theorem ====
If the midpoint of the line segment B̅F̅ is P, the Newton–Gauss line of the complete quadrilateral ABCDEF and the line PM determine an angle ∠PMN equal to ∠EFD.

===== Proof =====
First show that the triangles △NPM, △EDF are similar.

Since BE ∥ PN and FC ∥ PM, we know ∠NPM = ∠EAC. Also, $\tfrac{\overline{BE}}{\overline{PN}} = \tfrac{\overline{FC}}{\overline{PM}} = 2.$

In the cyclic quadrilateral ABCD, these equalities hold:

$$\begin{align}
\angle EDF &= \angle ADF + \angle EDA, \\
&= \angle ACB + \angle ABC, \\
&= \angle EAC.
\end{align}$$

Therefore, ∠NPM = ∠EDF.

Let R_{1}, R_{2} be the radii of the circumcircles of △EDB, △FCD respectively. Apply the law of sines to the triangles, to obtain:

$$\frac {\overline{BE}}{\overline{FC}}=\frac {2R_1\sin \angle EDB}{2R_2\sin \angle FDC}=\frac {R_1}{R_2}=\frac {2R_1\sin \angle EBD}{2R_2\sin \angle FCD} = \frac{\overline{DE}}{\overline{DF}}.$$

Since B̅E̅ = 2 · P̅N̅ and F̅C̅ = 2 · P̅M̅, this shows the equality $\tfrac{\overline{PN}}{\overline{PM}} = \tfrac{\overline{DE}}{\overline{DF}}.$ The similarity of triangles △PMN, △DFE follows, and ∠NMP = ∠EFD.

===== Remark =====
If Q is the midpoint of the line segment F̅C̅, it follows by the same reasoning that ∠NMQ = ∠EFA.

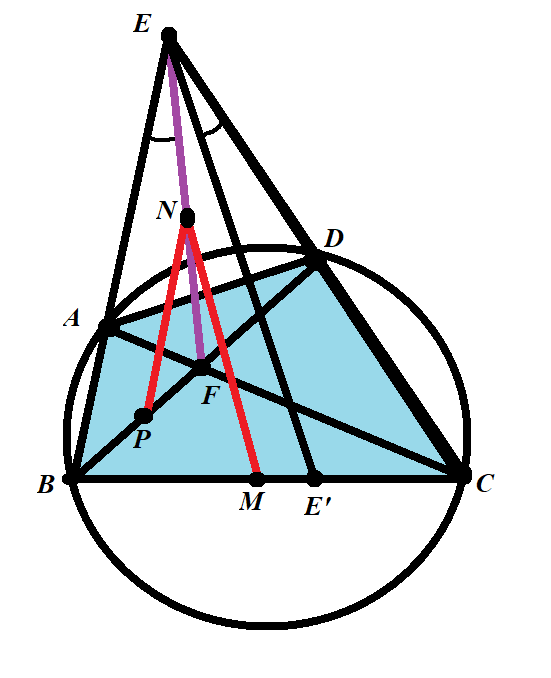
Figure 2: Isogonal lines.

=== Isogonal lines ===
==== Theorem ====
The line through E parallel to the Newton–Gauss line of the complete quadrilateral ABCDEF and the line EF are isogonal lines of ∠BEC, that is, each line is a reflection of the other about the angle bisector. (Figure 2)

===== Proof =====
Triangles △EDF, △NPM are similar by the above argument, so ∠DEF = ∠PNM. Let E' be the point of intersection of BC and the line parallel to the Newton–Gauss line NM through E.

Since PN ∥ BE and NM ∥ EE', ∠BEF = ∠PNF, and ∠FNM = ∠E'EF.

Therefore,
$$\begin{align}
\angle CEE' &= \angle DEF - \angle E'EF, \\
&= \angle PNM - \angle FNM, \\
&= \angle PNF = \angle BEF.
\end{align}$$

=== Two cyclic quadrilaterals sharing a Newton-Gauss line ===
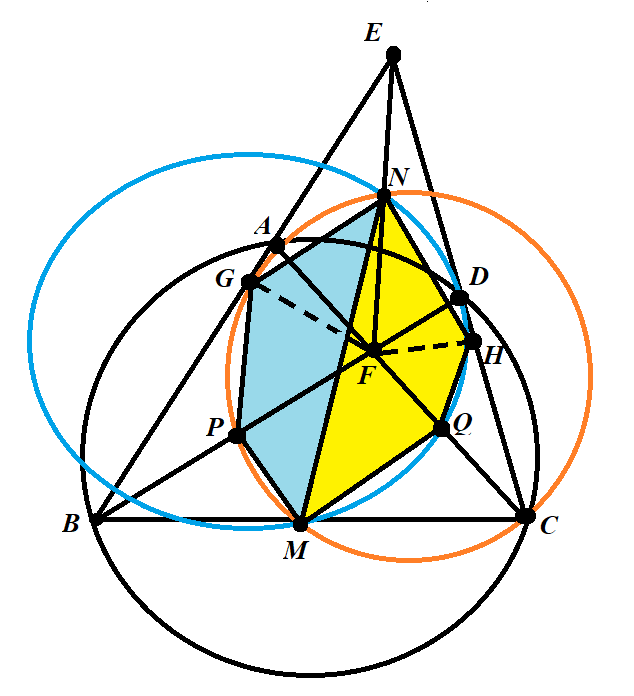
Figure 3: Showing that the quadrilaterals MPGN, MQHN are cyclic.

==== Lemma ====
Let G and H be the orthogonal projections of the point F on the lines AB and CD respectively.

The quadrilaterals MPGN and MQHN are cyclic quadrilaterals.

===== Proof =====
∠EFD = ∠PMN, as previously shown. The points P and N are the respective circumcenters of the right triangles △BFG, △EFG. Thus, ∠PGF = ∠PFG and ∠FGN = ∠GFN.

Therefore,

$$\begin{align}
\angle PGN + \angle PMN
& = (\angle PGF + \angle FGN) + \angle PMN  \\[4pt]
& = \angle PFG + \angle GFN + \angle EFD \\[4pt]
&= 180^\circ
\end{align}.$$

Therefore, MPGN is a cyclic quadrilateral, and by the same reasoning, MQHN also lies on a circle.

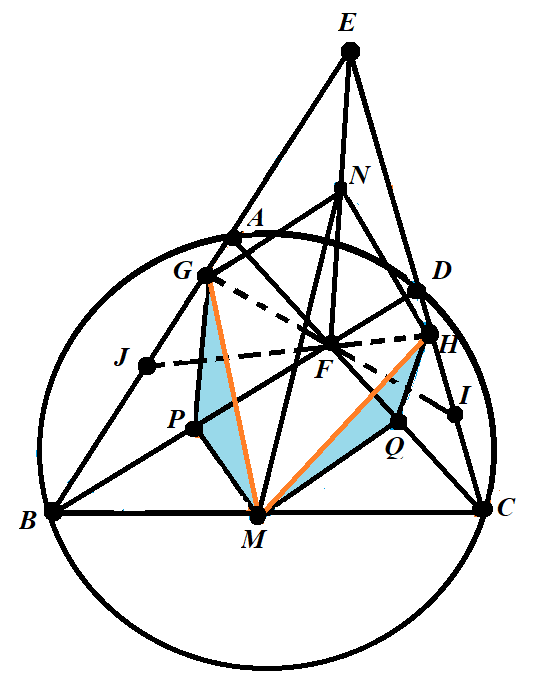
Figure 4: Showing that the complete quadrilaterals EDGHIJ, ABCDEF have the same Newton–Gauss line.

==== Theorem ====
Extend the lines GF, HF to intersect EC, EB at I, J respectively (Figure 4).

The complete quadrilaterals EFGHIJ and ABCDEF have the same Newton–Gauss line.

===== Proof =====
The two complete quadrilaterals have a shared diagonal, E̅F̅. N lies on the Newton–Gauss line of both quadrilaterals. N is equidistant from G and H, since it is the circumcenter of the cyclic quadrilateral EGFH.

If triangles △GMP, △HMQ are congruent, and it will follow that M lies on the perpendicular bisector of the line HG. Therefore, the line MN contains the midpoint of G̅H̅, and is the Newton–Gauss line of EFGHIJ.

To show that the triangles △GMP, △HMQ are congruent, first observe that PMQF is a parallelogram, since the points M, P are midpoints of B̅F̅, B̅C̅ respectively.

Therefore,

$$\begin{align}
& \overline{MP} = \overline{QF} = \overline{HQ}, \\
& \overline{GP} = \overline{PF} = \overline{MQ}, \\
& \angle MPF = \angle FQM.
\end{align}$$

Also note that

$$\angle FPG = 2 \angle PBG = 2 \angle DBA = 2 \angle DCA = 2 \angle HCF = \angle HQF.$$

Hence,
$$\begin{align}
\angle MPG &= \angle MPF + \angle FPG, \\
&= \angle FQM + \angle HQF, \\
&= \angle HQF + \angle FQM, \\
&= \angle HQM.
\end{align}$$

Therefore, △GMP and △HMQ are congruent by SAS.

===== Remark =====
Due to △GMP, △HMQ being congruent triangles, their circumcircles MPGN, MQHN are also congruent.

== Relation with the Miquel point ==
The point at infinity along the Newton–Gauss line is the isogonal conjugate of the Miquel point.

== Generalization ==
Dao Thanh Oai showed a generalization of the Newton–Gauss line.

For a triangle ABC, let l an arbitrary line and A_{0}B_{0}C_{0} the Cevian triangle of an arbitrary point P. l intersects BC, CA, and AB at A_{1}, B_{1}, and C_{1} respectively. Then AA_{1}∩B_{0}C_{0}, BB_{1}∩C_{0}A_{0}, and CC_{1}∩A_{0}B_{0} are colinear.

If P is the centroid of the triangle ABC, the line is Newton–Gauss line of the quadrilateral composed of AB, BC, CA, and l.

== History ==
The Newton–Gauss line proof was developed by the two mathematicians it is named after: Sir Isaac Newton and Carl Friedrich Gauss. The initial framework for this theorem is from the work of Newton, in his previous theorem on the Newton line, in which Newton showed that the center of a conic inscribed in a quadrilateral lies on the Newton–Gauss line.

The theorem of Gauss and Bodenmiller states that the three circles whose diameters are the diagonals of a complete quadrilateral are coaxal.
