= Gauss iterated map =

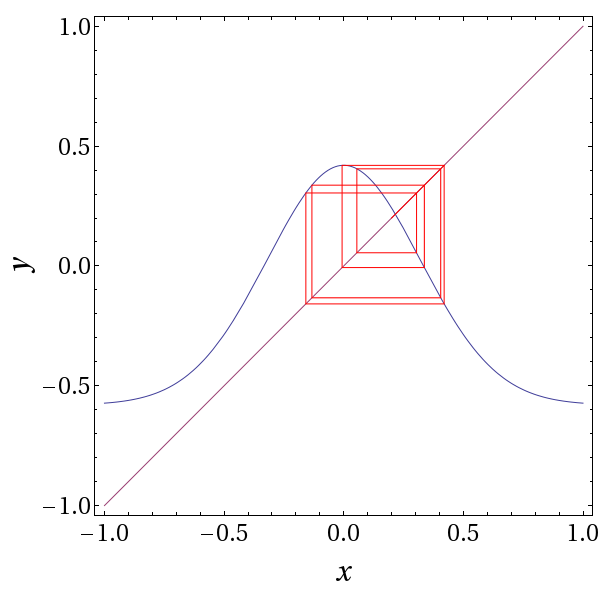
Cobweb plot of the Gauss map for $\alpha=4.90$ and $\beta=-0.58$. This shows an 8-cycle.

In mathematics, the Gauss map (also known as Gaussian map or mouse map), is a nonlinear iterated map of the reals into a real interval given by the Gaussian function:

$$x_{n+1} = \exp(-\alpha x^2_n)+\beta, \,$$

where α and β are real parameters.

Named after Johann Carl Friedrich Gauss, the function maps the bell shaped Gaussian function similar to the logistic map.

== Properties ==
In the parameter real space $x_n$ can be chaotic. The map is also called the mouse map because its bifurcation diagram resembles a mouse (see Figures).

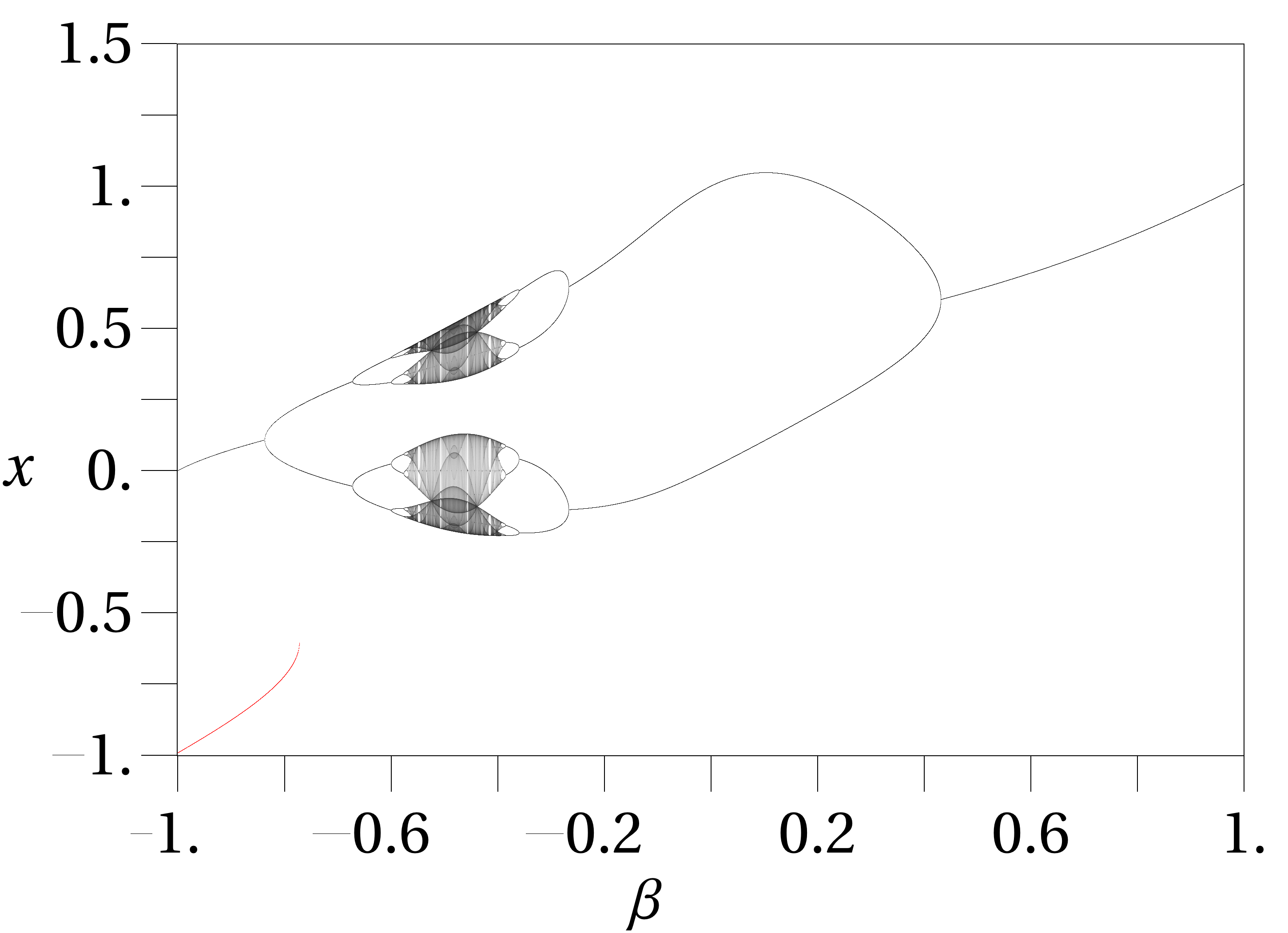
Bifurcation diagram of the Gauss map with $\alpha=4.90$ and $\beta$ in the range −1 to +1. This graph resembles a mouse.

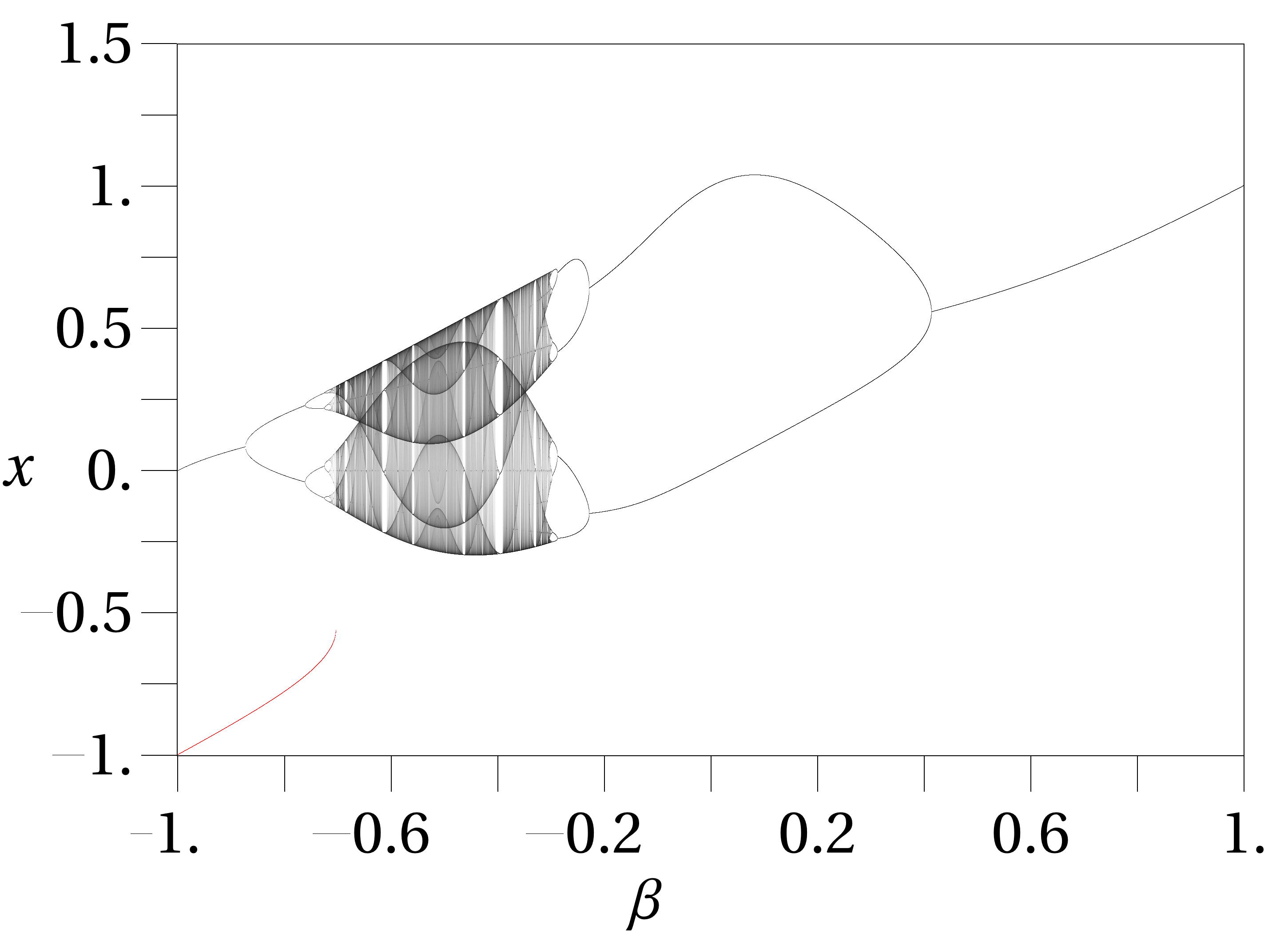
Bifurcation diagram of the Gauss map with $\alpha=6.20$ and $\beta$ in the range −1 to +1.
