= Filon =

Filon may refer to:

== People ==
=== With the surname ===
- Augustin Filon (1841–1916), French professor
- Beniamino Filon (1900–1948), Italian Roman Catholic priest
- Charles Auguste Désiré Filon (1800–1875), French historian
- Louis Napoleon George Filon (1875–1937), English mathematician

=== With the given name ===
- Filon Dzhelaliy, Cossack colonel
- Filon Kmita (1530–1597), Polish noble
- Filon Ktenidis (1889–1963), Greek playwright, accountant, journalist, and doctor

== Other uses ==
- Filon quadrature, a technique for numerical integration of oscillatory integrals
- Filon, a fiberglass material used as siding on truck campers

== See also ==
- Filón Sur Mine, a mine in Tharsis, Huelva, Spain
- Filone, an Italian yeast bread
