= Mary Summer =

French orientalist, writer

- Born: Marie Filon; 1842
- Died: 1902 (aged 59–60)
- Occupations: Writer, orientalist
- Spouse: Philippe Édouard Foucaux
- Father: Charles Auguste Désiré Filon

Mary Summer (1842–1902) was the pseudonym used by French writer and historian Marie Filon, who was recognized for her orientalist studies and her novels, as well as for being the wife of the renowned Tibetologist Philippe Édouard Foucaux.

== Biography ==
Marie Filon was the youngest daughter born to French historian, Charles Auguste Désiré Filon, and Marie Théodorine Sandrie-des-Fosses whom he had married on 25 August 1828. The couple had three children: François Gabriel (born 1835), Pierre-Marie Augustin Filon (1841–1916) and young Marie. Pierre-Marie Augustin, later known simply as Augustin, would become tutor to the Prince Imperial in 1867 and write prefaces for certain works by his sister, Mary Summer.

Little is known of Mary Summer as an adult, except that she married Philippe Édouard Foucaux, the French Tibetologist who authored the first Tibetan grammar books in French. Her husband was elected to the Collège de France in 1862.

Mary Summer also became a recognized orientalist, based on her numerous published works in this area.

== Selected works ==
Summer authored numerous works.

• Buddhist nuns from Sakya-Mouni to the present day. Preface by Augustin Filon. Paris: Ernest Leroux, 1873.

• History of Sakya-Mouni Buddha, from his birth to his death. Paris: Ernest Leroux, 1874.

• Tales and Legends of Ancient India. Paris: Ernest Leroux, 1878.

• The heroines of Kalidasa and the heroines of Shakespeare. Paris: Ernest Leroux, 1879.

• The Last Love of Mirabeau. Paris: C. Lévy, 1884.

• The Novel of an Academician, a true story of the 18th century. Preface by Augustin Filon. Paris: A. Lemerre, 1896.

• A few salons in Paris in the 18th century… Paris: L.-H. May, [undated].
