= Jahleel Brenton Carey =

17th century notorious British officer

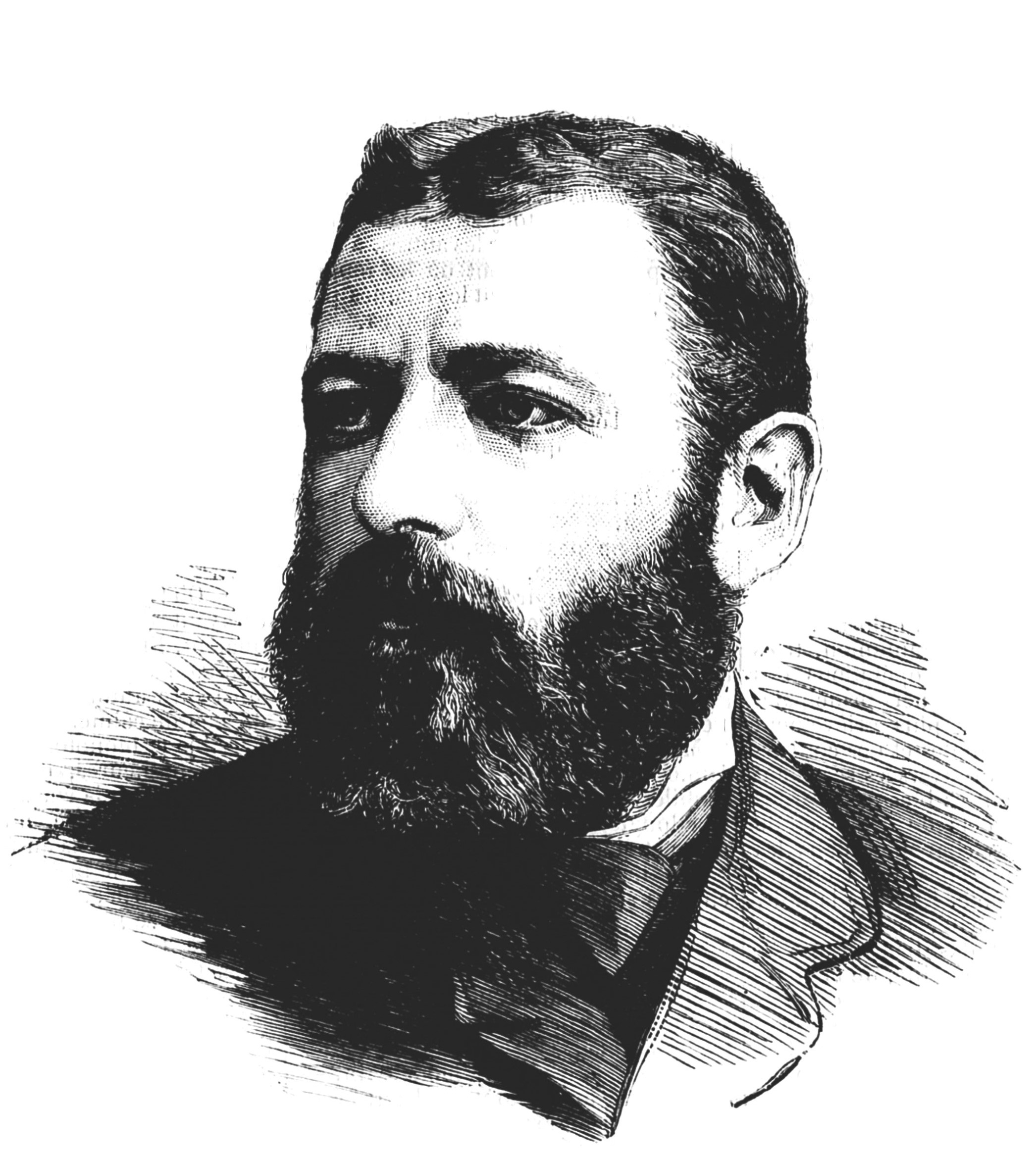
Jahleel Brenton Carey

Jahleel Brenton Carey (1847–1883) was a British officer who became notorious for his alleged responsibility for the death in action of Napoléon, Prince Imperial (1856–1879), at the hands of Zulu warriors in South Africa.

== Biographical background ==
Jahleel Carey was born in Hinckley, Leicestershire, on 18 July 1847. He was the son of Adolphus Frederick Carey, Vicar of Brixham, Devon, a member of the Carey family of Guernsey in the Channel Islands. Like many sons of the Guernsey Carey line, Jahleel was educated at Caen in Normandy. By 1864 he was a cadet at Royal Military Academy Sandhurst, and was gazetted as an ensign in 1865. He joined the 3rd West India Regiment in 1865, and served with the expeditionary force in British Honduras in 1867, where he was mentioned in despatches. In 1868 he was made a lieutenant in the 98th Regiment of Foot.

== The Death of the Prince Imperial ==
During the Anglo-Zulu War of 1879, an incident took place which was to drastically alter the hitherto promising military career of Jahleel Carey. The British had already been shaken by the embarrassing defeat inflicted on their force at the Battle of Isandlwana by the Zulu Impi on 22 January 1879.

The 23-year-old Prince Imperial was a 'guest' of the British army in its theatre of conflict in the Anglo-Zulu War of 1879. Anxious to gain military experience, he was permitted to take part in scouting parties in May, but had alarmed Frederic Thesiger, 2nd Baron Chelmsford, the Commander in Chief, by his habit of enthusiastically pursuing any Zulus he saw during these mounted reconnaissance patrols. He was consequently 'grounded' by Lord Chelmsford. Despite this, the Prince Imperial was allowed to accompany an eight-man mounted patrol on 1 June 1879, led by Lieutenant Carey. Carey had been given the task of the 'care' of the Prince Imperial, it has been supposed, because of his 'French' background, and his speaking fluent French.

It was at noon, about 3pm, that a break was ordered for coffee in a deserted kraal. After about an hour's rest, the Prince gave the order to remount; at this moment they were fired upon by a party of about 40 Zulus. In the melee that ensued, Carey said in his report that he gave the order to saddle up and retreat. However, a strap under the Prince Imperial's saddle broke, and the Prince was obliged to engage the leading Zulus: two shots were fired from his revolver, before he was cut down at close quarters by the Zulus' deadly weapon, the assegai.

== Outcomes ==
Carey was subsequently court-martialled on 12 June 1879, being accused of 'Misbehaviour before the Enemy'. He strenuously defended himself, pointing out the crucial factor that he was not in effective command of the patrol. It has since been recognized that Carey was placed in a dangerously ambivalent position, given the social deference expected from a junior officer vis-à-vis the status of the Prince Imperial and the consequent ambiguity of command. However, not all commentators – contemporary or modern, informed, partially informed, or uninformed – have been so balanced. The guilty finding was soon withdrawn, and Carey was acquainted of the fact by Prince George, Duke of Cambridge, in a letter dated 16 August 1879. In the same letter, Carey's promotion to captain, effective from 6 June 1879, was confirmed. Carey, however, never recovered the promise of his early years, and died soon after, at Bombay in 1883.
