= Edward Taylor-Jones =

English cricketer and clergyman

Edward William Tetley Taylor-Jones (28 May 1866 – 15 September 1956), born Edward William Tetley Jones, was an English clergyman and cricketer who played in two first-class cricket matches for Kent County Cricket Club in 1894.

Taylor-Jones was born at Sydenham in Lewisham in 1866, the son of William Taylor Jones and his wife Elizabeth Tetley. His father was a clergyman and schoolmaster. Taylor-Jones was educated at Queens' College, Cambridge, graduating in 1885, and followed his father into both professions, working at Herne House School in Margate in Kent whilst his father was headteacher there. He changed his surname to Taylor-Jones in 1891 and was ordained as a deacon at Chichester in December of the same year, serving as curate of Holy Trinity Church at Worthing in Surrey from 1891 to 1894.

Taylor-Jones played twice for the Kent First XI in the 1894 English cricket season, making his debut against Lancashire at Old Trafford in May and then playing against Marylebone Cricket Club (MCC) at Lord's later the same month. He played occasionally for the county Second XI as well as for amateur teams such as Band of Brothers. Between 1900 and 1902 he played a handful of matches for MCC, including one first-class match against Nottinghamshire in 1901. In club cricket he played as "a very effective batsman" for Rodmersham Cricket Club from when he became curate of the village in 1920, continuing playing until he was "passed the age of 65". He remained associated with Kent cricket for many years and played for church teams until at least 1931.

Before serving as curate at Rodmersham near Sittingbourne in Kent, Taylor-Jones had occupied the same position at St Paul's Church in Margate and at Chartham before being appointed rector at Kingsdown from 1922, also serving as rector of Milstead. He died at Kingsdown Rectory in 1956 aged 89.

== Bibliography ==
- Carlaw, Derek (2020). Kent County Cricketers, A to Z: Part One (1806–1914) (PDF). Cardiff: ACS.
