= Herne House School =

Former boarding school in England

Herne House School was a minor private boarding school for boys based in Margate, Kent, England, founded at the end of the 19th century and which was only open for a very short period.

== History ==
The school was founded by William Taylor Jones who was educated at Cambridge. The school was first sited in Arthur Road, Margate and later The Eastern Esplanade and opened about 1881. Jones’ son, Edward Taylor-Jones, was employed as a master and his cousin Ellen Taylor as a housekeeper. The peak enrollment for Herne House was 64 in 1891.

== Notable alumni ==
Amongst the pupils who attended the school, was John William Dibdin Heseltine aged eight whose father was a tea merchant trading as William Heseltine & Son Ltd and living in Anson Road, Islington. Financial problems led to the close of the business in 1889 and his father's suicide. John later married Marie Berthe Lefauvre and they became the grandparents of Michael Heseltine a notable Conservative cabinet minister in Margaret Thatcher’s government.

Another notable pupil was Louis Napoleon George Filon FRS, a notable applied mathematician and later Vice-Chancellor of London University from 1933-1935.
