= Memorial cross =

Type of memorial monument

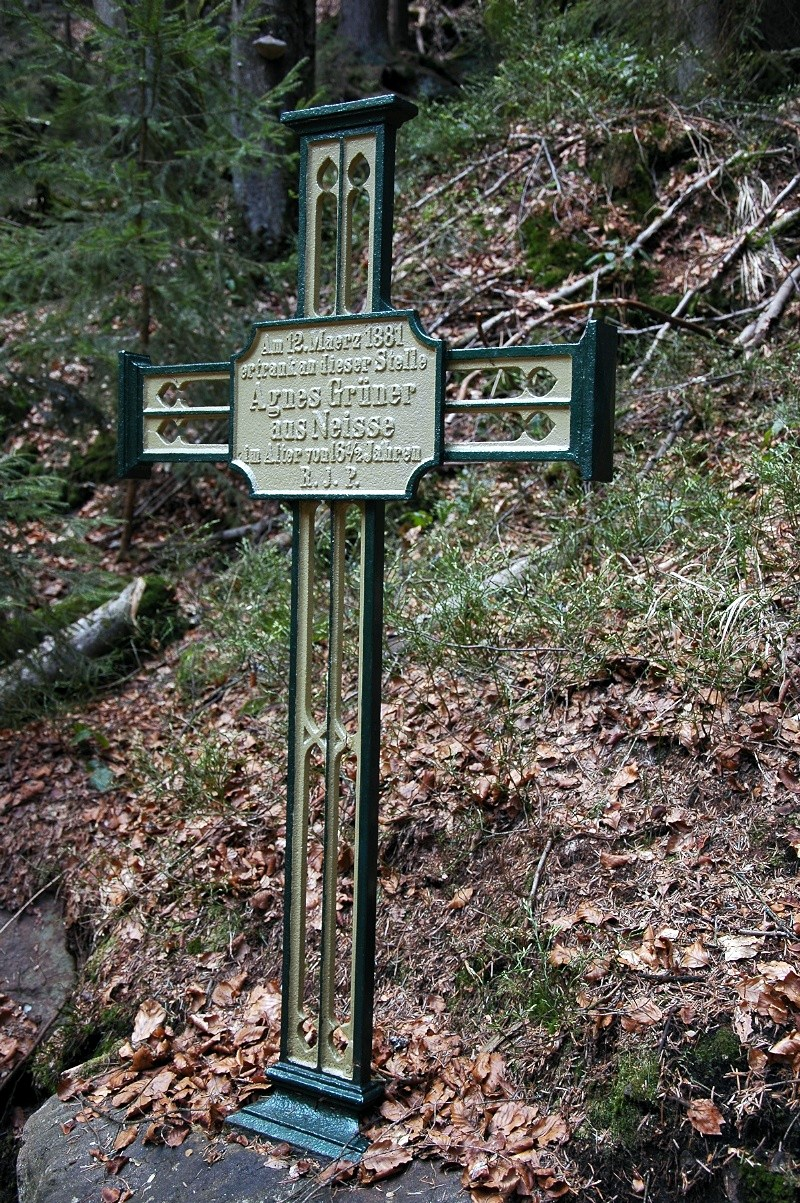
Cast iron memorial cross at Steinklamm, Bavarian Forest

A memorial cross (sometimes called an intending cross) is a cross-shaped memorial to commemorate a special event or an incident, typically where one or more people died. It may also be a simple form of headstone to commemorate the dead.

== File ==
In England, King Edward I had memorial crosses, the so-called Eleanor Crosses, erected in memory of his wife Eleanor of Castile who died in November 1290. Three of the original twelve crosses have survived.

In Germany today, the custom has arisen of erecting crosses (Unfallkreuze or "accident crosses") as roadside memorials at the spot where someone has been killed. These are maintained for shorter or longer periods of time and decorated e.g. with flowers or candles. In South Germany, especially in Bavaria, memorial crosses exist for those who died several generations ago. Some of these crosses are at very remote places. These, too, usually commemorate a fatal accident. These roadside memorial crosses should not be confused with wayside crosses, which are erected in the Bavarian region on the edge of paths and tracks, and are there simply to give walkers the opportunity to say a short prayer.

In the US, makeshift crosses are often placed at the scenes of car accidents where someone died, or at the scene of a death due to violence. White crosses are frequently seen along interstate highways and other roads. Friends, family, or other visitors may decorate the area with photos of the deceased, flowers, toys (when the deceased was a small child), and other meaningful memorabilia. Other memorial crosses commemorate war dead and victims of terrorism.

The tallest memorial cross in the world at 152.4 metres is the Monumento Nacional de Santa Cruz del Valle de los Caidos near El Escorial in Spain.

== Intending crosses ==
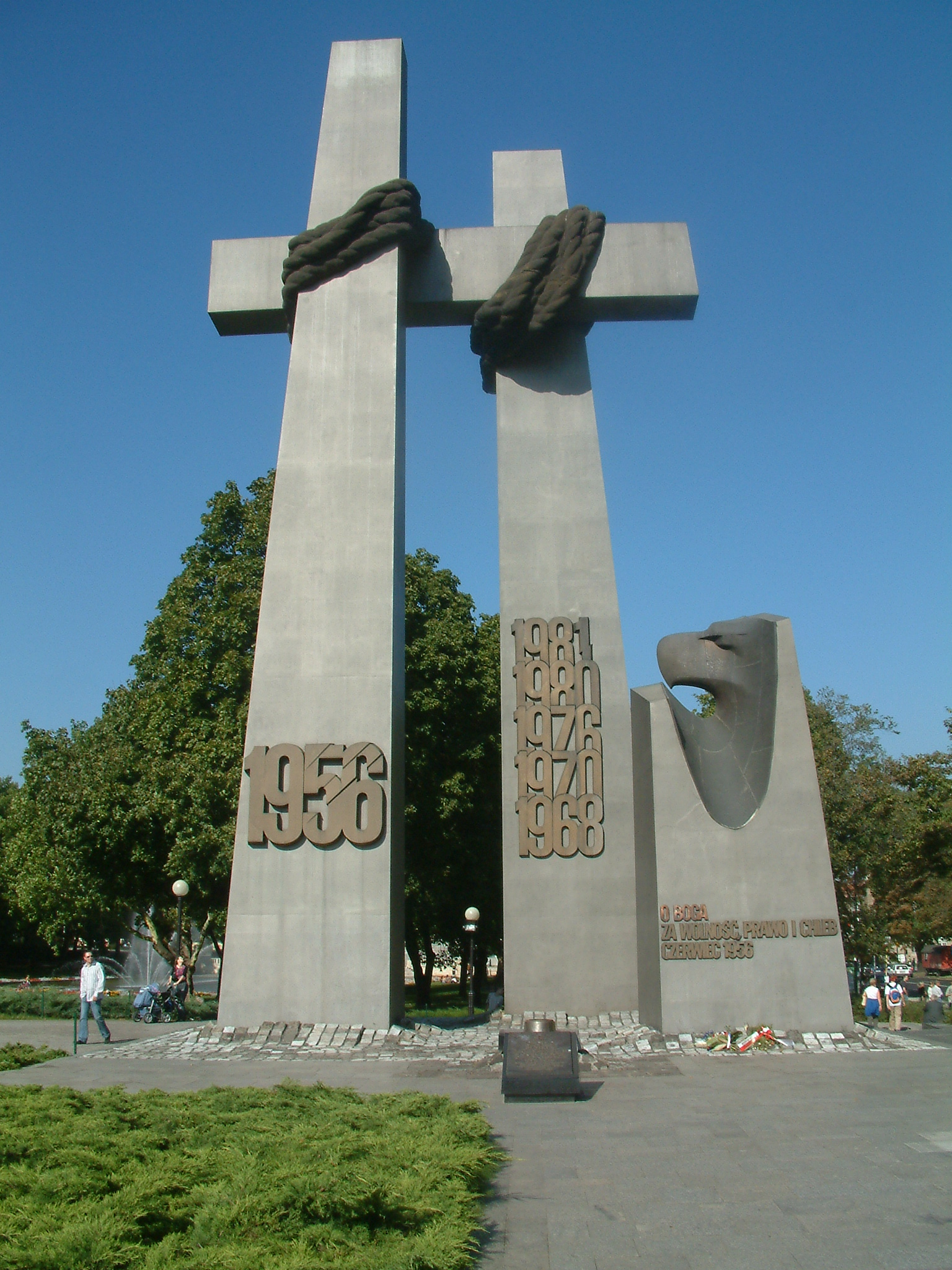
These memorial crosses commemorate the Poznań 1956 protests

- Ostlandkreuz
- Prince Imperial Memorial
- Ruckenkreuz

== See also ==
- Monumental crosses
- Eleanor cross
- Roadside memorial
- Tottenham High Cross
- Mount Samat
- Monument to fallen Shipyard Workers
