= Francis Monnier =

French literary figure

Francis Monnier was a French literary figure, specialising in the Carolingian era, notably the figure of Alcuin, who was briefly appointed in March 1863 tutor to the Prince Imperial, only son of Napoleon III, following the prince's seventh birthday. Monnier was occupied at the time with his Alcuin et Charlemagne, which was published in 1864. Monnier also wrote Guillaume de Lamoignon et Colbert: Essai sur la legislation française au XVIIe siècle (Paris, 1862).
