= Kingsdown, Swale =

Village in Kent, England

Coordinates: 51.300°N 0.767°E

Kingsdown
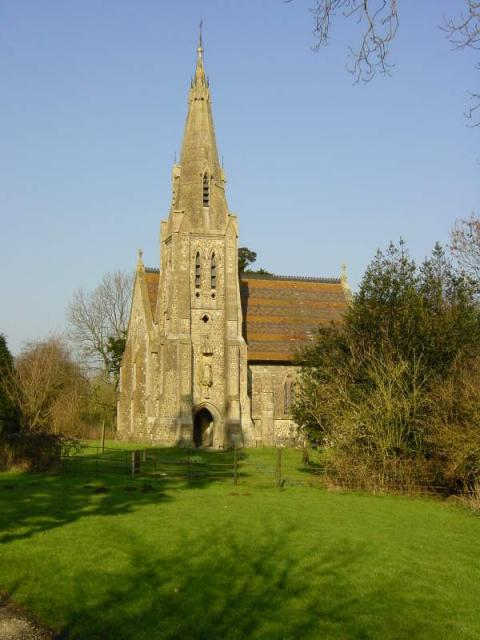
- St Catherine's Church

- Location within Kent
- OS grid reference: TQ9057
- Civil parish: Lynsted with Kingsdown
- District: Swale
- Shire county: Kent
- Region: South East
- Country: England
- Sovereign state: United Kingdom
- Post town: Sittingbourne
- Postcode district: ME9
- Dialling code: 01795
- Police: Kent
- Fire: Kent
- Ambulance: South East Coast
- UK Parliament: Sittingbourne and Sheppey

Kingsdown is a small village and former civil parish, now in the parish of Lynsted with Kingsdown, in the Swale district, in the county of Kent, England. It is surrounded by the villages of Frinsted, Milstead, Doddington and Lynsted. In 1961 the parish had a population of 54. On 1 April 1983 the parish was abolished to form "Milstead & Kingsdown".

The village was described by John Marius Wilson in his 1872 Imperial Gazetteer of England and Wales as a settlement of no more than 18 houses incorporating a population of 96.

== Barony of Kingsdown ==
The Barony of Kingsdown was a hereditary peerage conferred on Thomas Pemberton Leigh around 1858. Lord Kingsdown never married, and his title therefore became extinct on his death in 1867. Lord Kingsdown's seat was at Torry Hill (see below) which stayed in the family, later to be known as the Leigh-Pembertons. The manor extended to the environs of the hamlet of Kingsdown and was recorded as such by Wilson in 1872.

The title was resurrected this time as a life peerage for Robin Leigh-Pemberton (from a related family line) becoming Baron Kingsdown in 1993. Torry Hill, approximately 3 km due southwest of Kingsdown hamlet, is the family estate of the Leigh-Pemberton (formerly Pemberton Leigh) line.

== Kingsdown Church ==
The village is focused around a 19th-century redundant Anglican church dedicated to St Catherine. It has been designated by English Heritage as a Grade II listed building, and is under the care of the Churches Conservation Trust.

The maintenance of Kingsdown Church was funded by Lord Kingsdown. According to a booklet from the Redundant Churches Fund, the population of the surrounding parish numbered just 96 in 1865 meaning a benefactor was essential.

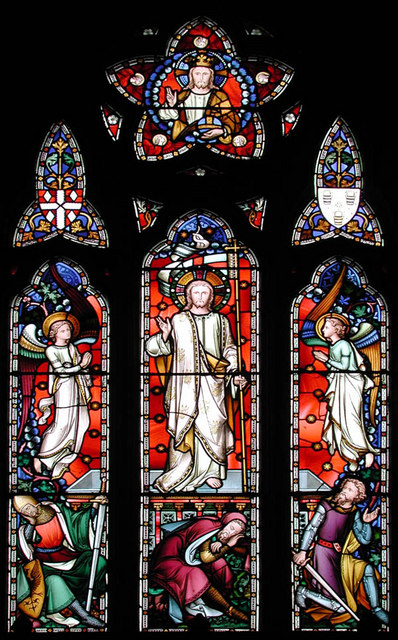
Hardman & Co. stained glass window in St Catherine's Church

Thomas Pemberton Leigh supported the building of a new church on the site of a mediaeval church (records from the rectory date back to 1313) that stood where today's nave stands. The church is believed to be the only remaining completed Anglican example of the work of Edward Welby Pugin, a noted ecclesiastical architect in Britain. The stained glass windows and possibly other internal fittings were installed by notable ecclesiastical manufacturers Hardman & Co. Edward Taylor-Jones, who had played first-class cricket for Kent County Cricket Club, was rector at the church from 1922 until his death at the rectory in 1956.

The church is normally locked but a key can be obtained by arrangement. The church and a number of outlying buildings are now stranded on the south side of the M2 motorway and can be reached via a footbridge from the village of Kingsdown.
