= L'Empereur, sa femme et le petit prince =

19th century French folk song

"L'Empereur, sa femme et le petit prince" is a French folk song of the second half of the 19th century, making a reference to Napoleon III, Empress Eugénie and the Prince impérial.

It is also known with the lyrics "le roi, la reine et le petit prince" (the king, the queen, and the little prince) and "Puisque c'est comme ça" rather than "Puisque c'est ainsi" (both "because it's like this" or "since this is how it is").

This song is used to teach the days of the week to children in French.

== Lyrics ==
1

Lundi matin,
L’empereur, sa femme et le p’tit prince
Sont venus chez moi, pour me serrer la pince.
Comme j’étais parti,
Le p’tit prince a dit :
« Puisque c’est ainsi, nous reviendrons mardi. »

2

Mardi matin,
L’empereur, sa femme et le p’tit prince
Sont venus chez moi, pour me serrer la pince.
Comme j’étais parti,
Le p’tit prince a dit :
« Puisque c’est ainsi, nous reviendrons mercredi. »

3

Mercredi matin,
L’empereur, sa femme et le p’tit prince
Sont venus chez moi, pour me serrer la pince.
Comme j’étais parti,
Le p’tit prince a dit :
« Puisque c’est ainsi, nous reviendrons jeudi. »

4

Jeudi matin,
L’empereur, sa femme et le p’tit prince
Sont venus chez moi, pour me serrer la pince.
Comme j’étais parti,
Le p’tit prince a dit :
« Puisque c’est ainsi, nous reviendrons vendredi. »

5

Vendredi matin,
L’empereur, sa femme et le p’tit prince
Sont venus chez moi, pour me serrer la pince.
Comme j’étais parti,
Le p’tit prince a dit :
« Puisque c’est ainsi, nous reviendrons samedi. »

6

Samedi matin,
L’empereur, sa femme et le p’tit prince
Sont venus chez moi, pour me serrer la pince.
Comme j’étais parti,
Le p’tit prince a dit :
« Puisque c’est ainsi, nous reviendrons dimanche. »

7

Dimanche matin,
L’empereur, sa femme et le p’tit prince
Sont venus chez moi, pour me serrer la pince.
Comme j’étais parti,
Le p’tit prince a dit :
« Puisque c’est ainsi, nous ne reviendrons plus. »

== English translation ==
Monday morning, The emperor, his wife and the little prince Came to my house, to shake my hand. As I was gone, The little prince said: "Since that's how it is, we'll come back on Tuesday. "

Tuesday morning, The emperor, his wife and the little prince Came to my house, to shake my hand. As I was gone, The little prince said: "Since that's how it is, we'll come back on Wednesday. "

Wednesday morning, The emperor, his wife and the little prince Came to my house, to shake my hand. As I was gone, The little prince said: "Since that's how it is, we'll come back on Thursday. "

Thursday morning, The emperor, his wife and the little prince Came to my house, to shake my hand. As I was gone, The little prince said: "Since that's how it is, we'll come back on Friday. "

Friday morning, The emperor, his wife and the little prince Came to my house, to shake my hand. As I was gone, The little prince said: "Since that's how it is, we'll come back on Saturday. "

Saturday morning, The emperor, his wife and the little prince Came to my house, to shake my hand. As I was gone, The little prince said: "Since that's how it is, we'll come back on Sunday. "

Sunday morning, The emperor, his wife and the little prince Came to my house, to shake my hand. As I was gone, The little prince said: "Since that's how it is, we won't come back again."
