= Louis Napoleon George Filon =

French mathematician (1875–1937)

Louis Napoleon George Filon FRS
- Filon c. 1930s

Vice-Chancellor of the University of London
- In office 1933–1935
- Preceded by: John Leigh Smeathman Hatton
- Succeeded by: Herbert Lightfoot Eason

Personal details
- Born: 22 November 1875 Saint-Cloud, Paris, France
- Died: 29 December 1937 (aged 62) Croydon, United Kingdom
- Parent: Augustin Filon (father)
- Education: Herne House School
- Alma mater: University College London; King's College, Cambridge
- Known for: Filon quadrature
- Scientific career
- Fields: Applied mathematics
- Institutions: University College London; University of London
- Academic advisors: Karl Pearson; Micaiah John Muller Hill

Louis Napoleon George Filon, FRS (22 November 1875 – 29 December 1937) was an English applied mathematician, famous for his research on classical mechanics and particularly the theory of elasticity and the mechanics of continuous media. He also developed a method for the numerical quadrature of oscillatory integrals, now known as Filon quadrature. He was Vice Chancellor of the University of London from 1933 to 1935.

== Early life ==
He was born at Saint-Cloud, near Paris, as the only child of Augustin Filon, the French littérateur who was appointed as the official tutor to the Prince Imperial. Accompanying the Prince Imperial in his exile, the Filon family came to England in 1878 and lived at Margate. He was educated at Herne House School in Margate.

== Career ==
In 1894 Filon became a student at University College London and received his BA in 1896 with a gold medal in Greek. He was appointed in the college as demonstrator in applied mathematics under the supervision of Karl Pearson. He spotted a mistake in Pearson's lectures and the correction was incorporated into a joint publication with Pearson. This important paper was Filon's only publication in statistics.

In 1898 Filon went to King's College, Cambridge on an 1851 Exhibition Research Fellowship for advanced study. In July 1902 he earned a doctorate in mixed mathematics from University College, London, and in 1903 he became there a lecturer in pure mathematics under M J M Hill. In 1910 Filon was elected a fellow of the Royal Society. In 1912, upon Pearson's retirement, Filon was appointed to the Goldsmid Chair of Applied Mathematics and Mechanics at University College, London. Except for an academic leave during his military service in the First World War, he occupied this chair until his death in 1937. Filon was also director of the University of London Observatory from 1929 to 1937. He was the author of over 50 papers and three books (one as co-author with E. G. Coker).

He was a member of the University of London Senate (1920) and the court, dean of the Faculty of Science, chairman of the Academic Council (1924–33) and vice-chancellor (1933–35). During his term of office, the foundation stone was laid for the university's Bloomsbury headquarters.

== Personal life ==
In 1904 he married Anne, eldest daughter of Professor Philippe Godet, of the University of Neuchâtel and had a son and two daughters. He died in Croydon during the Croydon typhoid outbreak of 1937.

== Works ==
- Treatise on Photoelasticity (1931) – with E G Coker
- A Manual of Photoelasticity for Engineers (1936)

== See also ==
- List of Vice-Chancellors of the University of London
- List of British university chancellors and vice-chancellors
- Photoelasticity
- Biharmonic equation

Academic offices
Preceded by John Leigh Smeathman Hatton	Vice-Chancellor of the University of London; 1933–1935	Succeeded by Sir Herbert Lightfoot Eason; CMG CB
