= Philippe Édouard Foucaux =

French scholar and orientalist (1801–1852)

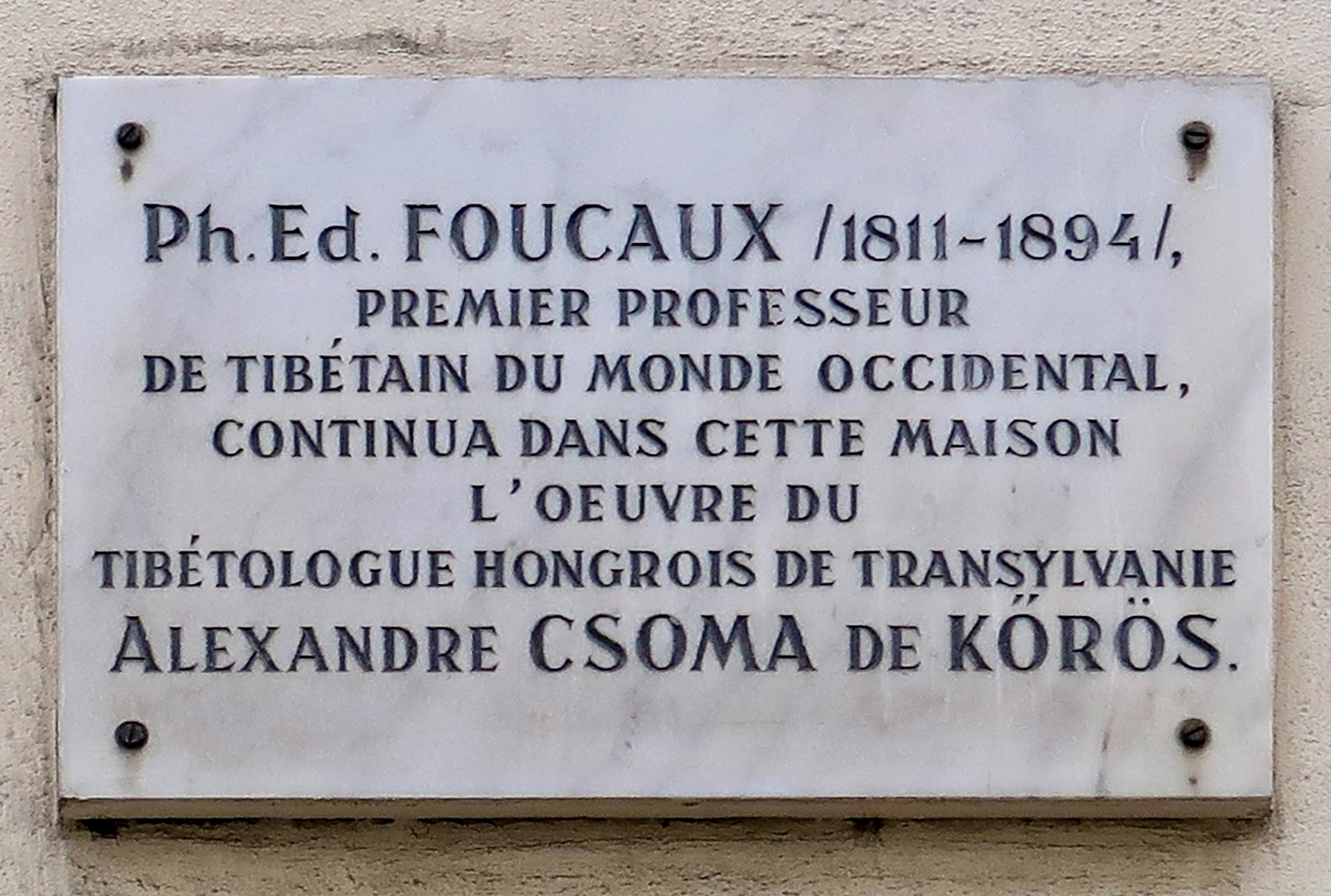
- Born: 15 September 1811; Paris, France
- Died: 20 May 1894 (aged 82)
- Occupation: Orientalist
- Known for: First professor of Tibetan in Europe
- Spouse: Mary Summer

Philippe Édouard Foucaux (15 September 1811 – 20 May 1894) was a French tibetologist. He published the first Tibetan grammar in French and occupied the first chair of Tibetan Studies in Europe.

He was born in the town of Angers on 15 September to merchant family. At the age of 27, he left for Paris to study Indology with Eugène Burnouf. After becoming aware of the work of Sándor Kőrösi Csoma, he studied Tibetan by himself for two years. After this he was appointed as a Tibetan teacher at the École des langues orientales where he gave his inaugural lecture on 31 January 1842. Funding for the position was canceled but Foucaux continued to instruct his students thereafter on a pro bono basis. Some of his most well-known students include Léon Feer, William Woodville Rockhill, and Alexandra David-Néel.

Foucaux was a member of the Sociéte d'Ethnographie. After France became the Second Empire, Foucaux was elected as a member of the Collège de France. Foucaux was married to Mary Summer, born Marie Filon, who also did work as a buddhologist. He was a corresponding member of the American Oriental Society from 1865. A number of Sanskrit, Tibetan, and Chinese manuscripts and printed books from his library were acquired by the National Library of France and are preserved there.

== Works ==
- 1842 Discours prononcé à l'ouverture du cours de langue et de littérature tibétaine près la Bibliothèque royale. Paris: Lacrampe.
- 1858 Grammaire de la langue tibétaine. Paris: L'imprimerie impériale.
- 1858 Le trésor des belles paroles, choix de sentences composées en tibétain; suivies d'une élégie tirée du Kanjour. Paris: B. Duprat.
- 1860 Histoire du Bouddha Sakya Muni. Paris: B. Duprat.
- 1884-1892 Le Lalita Vistara. In two parts. Paris: E. Leroux.

== Works about Foucaux ==
- Le Calloc'h, Bernard. "Philippe-Edouard Foucaux: First Tibetan teacher in Europe." Tibet Journal 12.1 (1987): 39–49.
- Le Calloc'h, Bernard. Un Angevin oublié, Philippe-Edouard Foucaux, le premier tibétologue français.
- Li, Charles. "Philippe-Édouard Foucaux in the margins." Texts Surrounding Texts: Satellite Stanzas, Prefaces and Colophons in South-Indian Manuscripts. 26 March 2021.
