= Prince Imperial Memorial =

Memorial cross and battlefield in South Africa

Coordinates: 28°07′55.3″S 30°47′49.5″E

- French: Mémorial du Prince Impérial
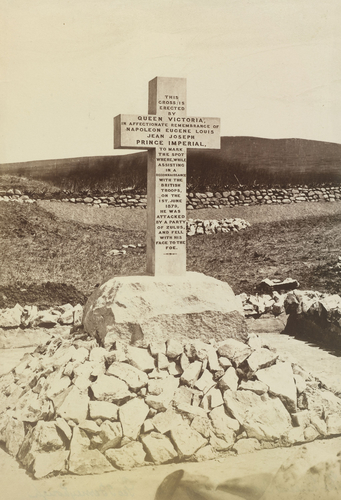
- Prince Imperial Memorial
- Year: 1880
- Subject: Memorial cross to Napoléon, Prince Imperial
- Location: Nqutu, KwaZulu-Natal, South Africa

The Prince Imperial Memorial is a memorial cross and battlefield in Nqutu, KwaZulu-Natal, South Africa. It is dedicated to Napoléon, Prince Imperial of France who made his last stand on the site in 1879 and was built on the spot where he died. The memorial was erected on the orders of Queen Victoria, who paid for it, in 1880.

== Background ==
Napoléon, Prince Imperial was the only son of Napoleon III, Emperor of the French. He fought for the British Army and Queen Victoria was his godmother. On 1 June 1879 in Zululand, the Prince Imperial was ambushed by Zulu warriors and was killed after 18 assegai wounds. The Zulus did not desecrate the body as was their custom out of fear after seeing a necklace with the Virgin Mary on that the Prince wore which they believed was a magical talisman.

== Erection ==
The death of the Prince Imperial caused international outrage as Queen Victoria only authorised him to go providing the army kept him out of danger. Queen Victoria ordered the erection of a memorial on the spot where he died, paying for it personally. The cross was enscribed "'This cross is erected by Queen Victoria, in affectionate remembrance of Napoleon Eugene Louis Jean Joseph Prince Imperial, to mark the spot where, while assisting in a reconnaissance with the British troops, on the 1st June 1879, he was attacked by a party of Zulus, and fell with his face to the foe." When the memorial was finished, Zulu warriors saluted it with British Army soldiers.

On the first anniversary of his death, his mother Empress Eugénie visited the site of her son's death. She kept a vigil all night and noticed she was being watched by Zulus who she believed to have been the ones who had killed her son.

== Later history ==
On the centenary of the Prince Imperial's death in 1979, the French Ambassador to South Africa visited the memorial and a commemorative plaque was installed at the site. In 1996, KwaZulu-Natal promoted the route to the memorial that Empress Eugénie took as La Route du Prince Impérial, Louis Napoléon. In 2006, an interpretive wall was built nearby as part of the memorial site, funded by a Frenchman from Réunion. Traditionally on the Sunday closest to 1 June, French people and Zulus meet together at the site to commemorate the Prince.
