= John Leigh Smeathman Hatton =

Professor John Leigh Smeathman (27 May 1865 – 13 January 1933) was a mathematician and Principal of East London College, England, one of the founding colleges of what is now Queen Mary College, part of London University. He was also Vice Chancellor of London University in the 1930s.

== Early life ==
Smeathman was born in Street Aston, near Rugby, Warwickshire. on 27 May 1865, the eldest son of Revd J L S Hatton, Rector of West Barkwith, Lincolnshire.

He was educated at Hertford College, Oxford where he obtained an MA graduating with first class honours in 1889 and second class honours in physics a year later. He also later qualified as a barrister at Lincoln's Inn. He also studied geometry at Oxford as an undergraduate under Savilian Professor of Geometry James Joseph Sylvester.

== Career ==
He was Director of Evening Classes (1892–1896), later Director of Studies 1896–1908 and Principal, East London College (University of London), now Queen Mary College, 1896–1933. He was Deputy Vice-Chancellor of the University of London from 1930 to 1931 and Vice-Chancellor from 1932 to 1933. He was Dean of the Faculty of Science at the university from 1922 to 1926. He also served as a member of the Essex and the West Ham Education Committees during the 1920s.

== Personal life ==
In 1897 he married Pauline Carlyle, daughter of R J Henderson of Colombo and they had two sons.

== Notable publications ==
- The Principles of Projective Geometry applied to the straight line and conic, 1913, reprinted BiblioBazaar (18 November 2009) ISBN 1117107124 ISBN 978-1117107127
- The Theory of the Imaginary in Geometry: Together with the Trigonometry of the Imaginary (Cambridge Library Collection – Mathematics), 1920, reprinted Cambridge University Press (2 September 2010), ISBN 1108013104 ISBN 978-1108013109

== See also ==
- List of Vice-Chancellors of the University of London
- List of British university chancellors and vice-chancellors

Academic offices
Preceded by Dr J. Scott Lidgett	Vice-Chancellor of the University of London; 1932–1933	Succeeded by Louis Napoleon George Filon
