= Filon Ktenidis =

Greek doctor (1889–1963)

Filon Ktenidis (Φίλων Κτενίδης; 1889 – 13 July 1963) was a Pontic Greek playwright, accountant, journalist, medical doctor and the founder of Panagia Soumela in Kastania, Vermiou in Greece.

== Biography ==
=== Early life and education ===
Born in 1889 in Trapezus, Pontus, he spent his childhood days in Kromni. In 1906 he graduated with excellent grades at the Frontistirion (High School) of Trapezous.

=== Career ===
In 1906–1909 he began work as an accountant. Αt the same time he was a contributor to the Trapezuntine newspaper Ethniki Drasi (National Action).

In 1910 he published his own fortnightly newspaper, Epitheoro, and was expelled by the Neo Turks and fled to Athens, where he enrolled in the university's Medical School. In 1912–13 he volunteered in the Greek army and took part in operations in Epirus and Macedonia (Greece). In 1914–1915 he returned to Trapezus to offer his voluntary services as a medical doctor, to the people of the outer Greek regions of Trapezounta.

With the entry of the Russian troops to Trapezus in 1916, he traveled to the Caucasus where between 1915 and 1917 he worked as a medical doctor in a Russian military hospital. In 1918 he became the President of the National Council of Pontos in Krassnodor, Russia. Ιn 1922 he returned to Thessaloniki where he practiced as a medical doctor. He was the author of 17 well known Pontian theatrical plays. He served as an MP after the 1935 legislative elections in Greece.

He died in July 1963.

== Sources ==
- «Εεγκυκλοπαίδεια ποντιακός ελληνισμός» (12 τομοι)
