= Filone =

Type of Italian bread

- Type: Bread
- Place of origin: Italy
- Main ingredients: Flour, yeast

Filone is a classic everyday Italian yeast bread, with a texture and crumb similar to the French baguette.

The name of the bread comes from the Italian word filo, meaning 'line'.
