= Augustin Filon =

French writer (1841–1916)

Pierre Marie Augustin Filon (1841–1916) was a French professor of rhetoric and the author of a number of works of fiction, as well many articles, reviews and books on contemporary English politics, art and literature.

The son of the historian Charles Auguste Désiré Filon and Marie Théodorine Sandrie-des-Fosses whom he had married on 25 August 1828, Augustin was born in Paris. Educated at the École normale, he lectured for some years in the Lycées of Nice and Grenoble. In October 1867, Duruy, then the French minister of education, appointed him tutor to the Prince Imperial. During the Empress's Regency in 1870, M. Filon acted as her private secretary. Upon the fall of the Second French Empire, the Prince Imperial was exiled to Chislehurst, Kent, accompanied by Filon, who settled in England with his family. He also wrote on English subjects, chiefly under the pseudonym of Pierre Sandrié.

He also wrote the prefaces for certain works by his younger sister, historian and writer Mary Summer.

His only child was the distinguished applied mathematician Louis Napoleon George Filon, who worked with Karl Pearson.

== Works ==
- Guy Patin, sa vie, sa correspondance (1862)
- Les Mariages de Londres (1875)
- Histoire de la littérature anglaise (1883)
- Nos grands-pères (1887)
- Garrick's Pupil (1893)
- Prosper Mérimée (1894)
- Le Théâtre anglais (1896)
- Sous la tyrannie (1900)
- La Caricature en Angleterre (1902)
- Le Prince Impérial: Souvenirs et Documents (1912)
- Souvenirs sur l'Impératrice Eugénie (1920)
