= Filon quadrature =

Integration method for oscillatory integrals

In numerical analysis, Filon quadrature or Filon's method is a technique for numerical integration of oscillatory integrals. It is named after English mathematician Louis Napoleon George Filon, who first described the method in 1934.

== Description ==
The method is applied to oscillatory definite integrals in the form:

$$\int_a^b f(x) g(x) dx$$

where $f(x)$ is a relatively slowly-varying function and $g(x)$ is either sine or cosine or a complex exponential that causes the rapid oscillation of the integrand, particularly for high frequencies. In Filon quadrature, the $f(x)$ is divided into $2N$ subintervals of length $h$, which are then interpolated by parabolas. Since each subinterval is now converted into a Fourier integral of quadratic polynomials, these can be evaluated in closed-form by integration by parts. For the case of $g(x)=\cos(kx)$, the integration formula is given as:

$$\int_a^b f(x) \cos(kx) dx \approx h ( \alpha \left[ f(b) \sin(kb)-f(a) \sin(ka)\right] + \beta C_{2n} + \gamma C_{2n-1} )$$

where

$$\alpha=\left(\theta^2 + \theta \sin(\theta)\cos(\theta)-2 \sin^2(\theta)\right)/\theta^3$$
$$\beta=2\left[\theta (1+\cos^2(\theta)) - 2\sin(\theta)\cos(\theta) \right]/\theta^3$$
$$\gamma=4(\sin(\theta)-\theta \cos(\theta))/\theta^3$$
$$C_{2n}=\frac{1}{2}f(a)\cos(ka) + f(a+2h)\cos(k(a+2h)) + f(a+4h)\cos(k(a+4h)) + \ldots + \frac{1}{2}f(b)\cos(kb)$$
$$C_{2n-1}=f(a+h)\cos(k(a+h)) + f(a+3h)\cos(k(a+3h)) + \ldots + f(b-h)\cos(k(b-h))$$
$$\theta=kh$$

Explicit Filon integration formulas for sine and complex exponential functions can be derived similarly. The formulas above fail for small $\theta$ values due to catastrophic cancellation; Taylor series approximations must be in such cases to mitigate numerical errors, with $\theta=1/6$ being recommended as a possible switchover point for 44-bit mantissa.

Modifications, extensions and generalizations of Filon quadrature have been reported in numerical analysis and applied mathematics literature; these are known as Filon-type integration methods. These include Filon-trapezoidal and Filon–Clenshaw–Curtis methods.

== Applications ==
Filon quadrature is widely used in physics and engineering for robust computation of Fourier-type integrals. Applications include evaluation of oscillatory Sommerfeld integrals for electromagnetic and seismic problems in layered media and numerical solution to steady incompressible flow problems in fluid mechanics, as well as various different problems in neutron scattering, quantum mechanics and metallurgy.

== See also ==
- Tanh–sinh quadrature
