= Louis-Napoléon, Prince Imperial =

Son of Napoleon III (1856–1879)

Louis-Napoléon
- Prince Imperial of France
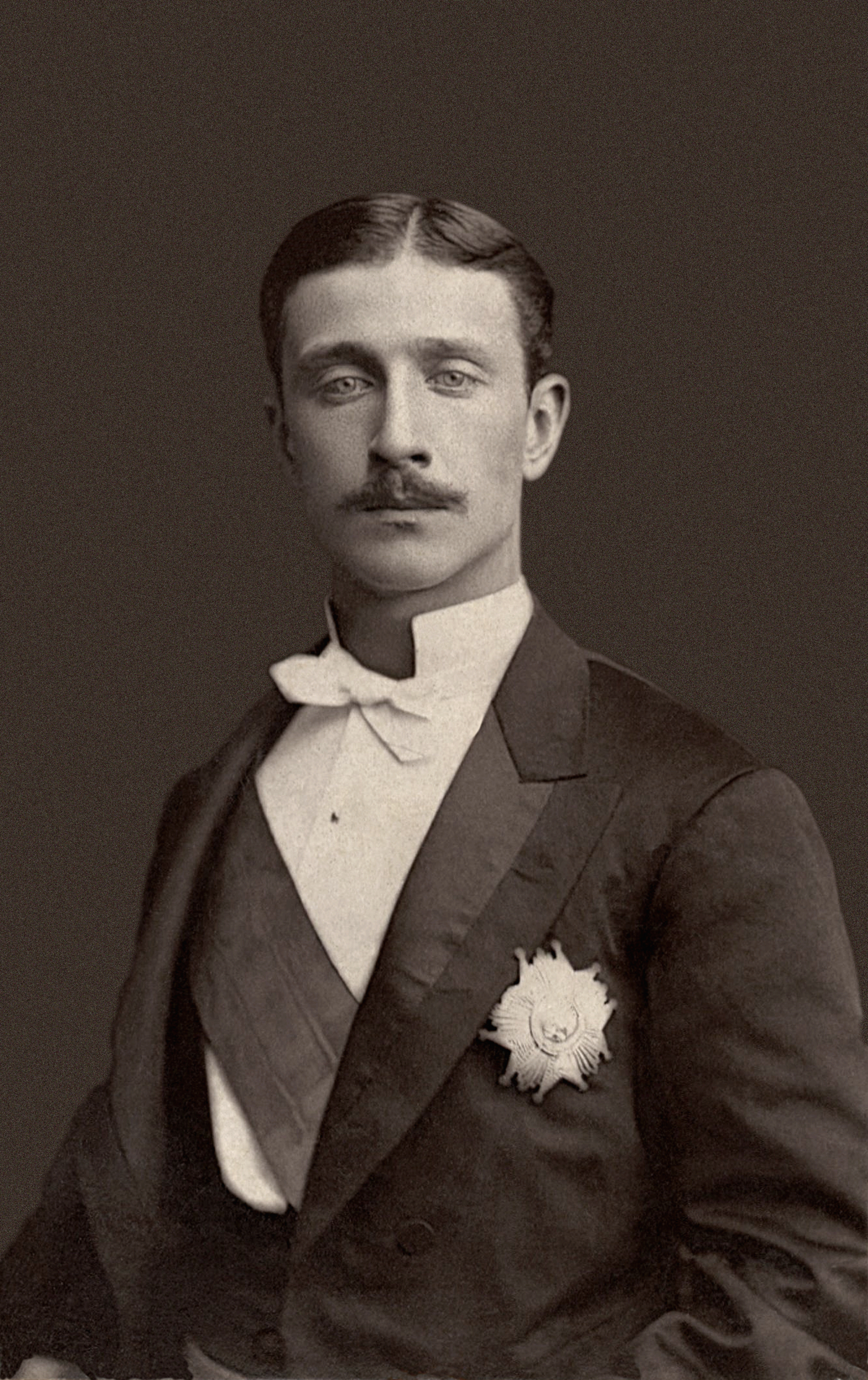
- Louis-Napoléon in 1878

Head of the House of Bonaparte
- Period: 9 January 1873 – 1 June 1879
- Predecessor: Napoleon III
- Successor: Napoléon-Jérôme or Napoléon Victor
- Born: 16 March 1856; Tuileries Palace, Paris, French Empire
- Died: 1 June 1879 (aged 23); Sobhuza's kraal near Ulundi, Zulu Kingdom (present South Africa)
- Burial: St Michael's Abbey, Farnborough
Names
- Napoléon Eugène Louis Jean Joseph Bonaparte
- House: Bonaparte
- Father: Napoleon III
- Mother: Eugénie de Montijo
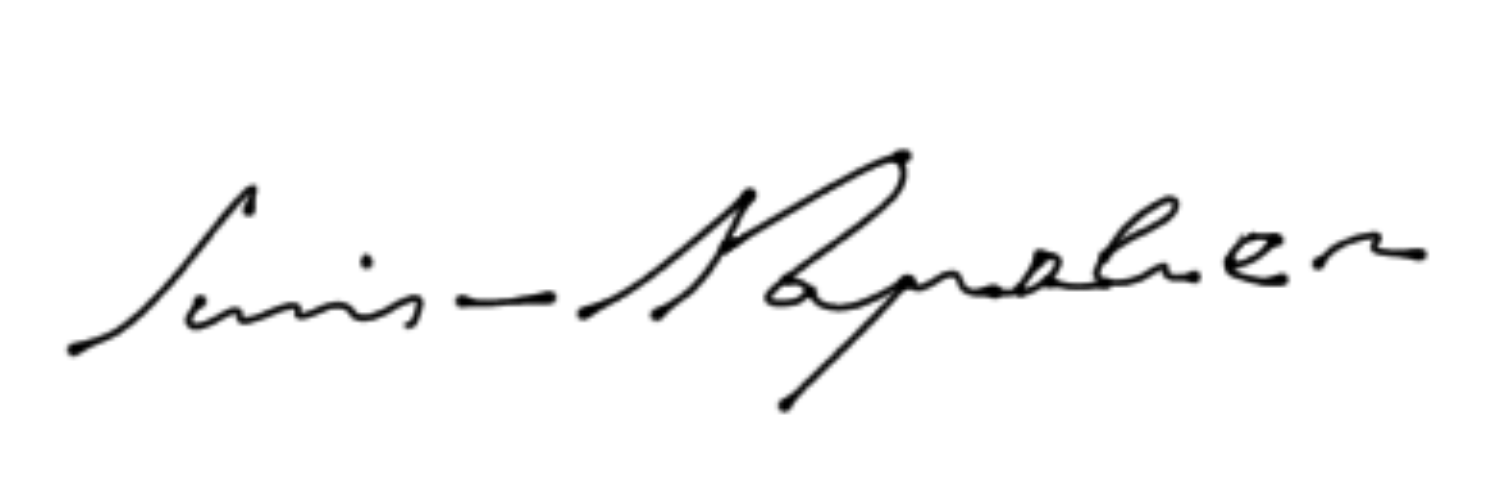
- Signature
- Military career
- Allegiance: United Kingdom
- Branch: British Army
- Service years: 1870–1879
- Rank: Lieutenant
- Units: Royal Engineers; Royal Artillery
- Conflicts: Anglo-Zulu War †

Louis-Napoléon, Prince Imperial (Napoléon Eugène Louis Jean Joseph Bonaparte; 16 March 1856 – 1 June 1879), also known as Louis-Napoléon, was the only child of Napoleon III, Emperor of the French, and Empress Eugénie. After his father was dethroned and exiled in 1870, he moved to England with his family. On his father's death in January 1873, he was proclaimed by the Bonapartist faction as Napoléon IV.

In England, he trained as a British Army officer. Keen to see action, he persuaded the British to allow him to participate in the Anglo-Zulu War. In 1879, serving with the British armed forces, he was killed in a skirmish incident with a group of Zulus. His death caused an international sensation and sent shockwaves throughout Europe, as he was the last serious dynastic hope for the restoration of the House of Bonaparte to the throne of France.

== Biography ==
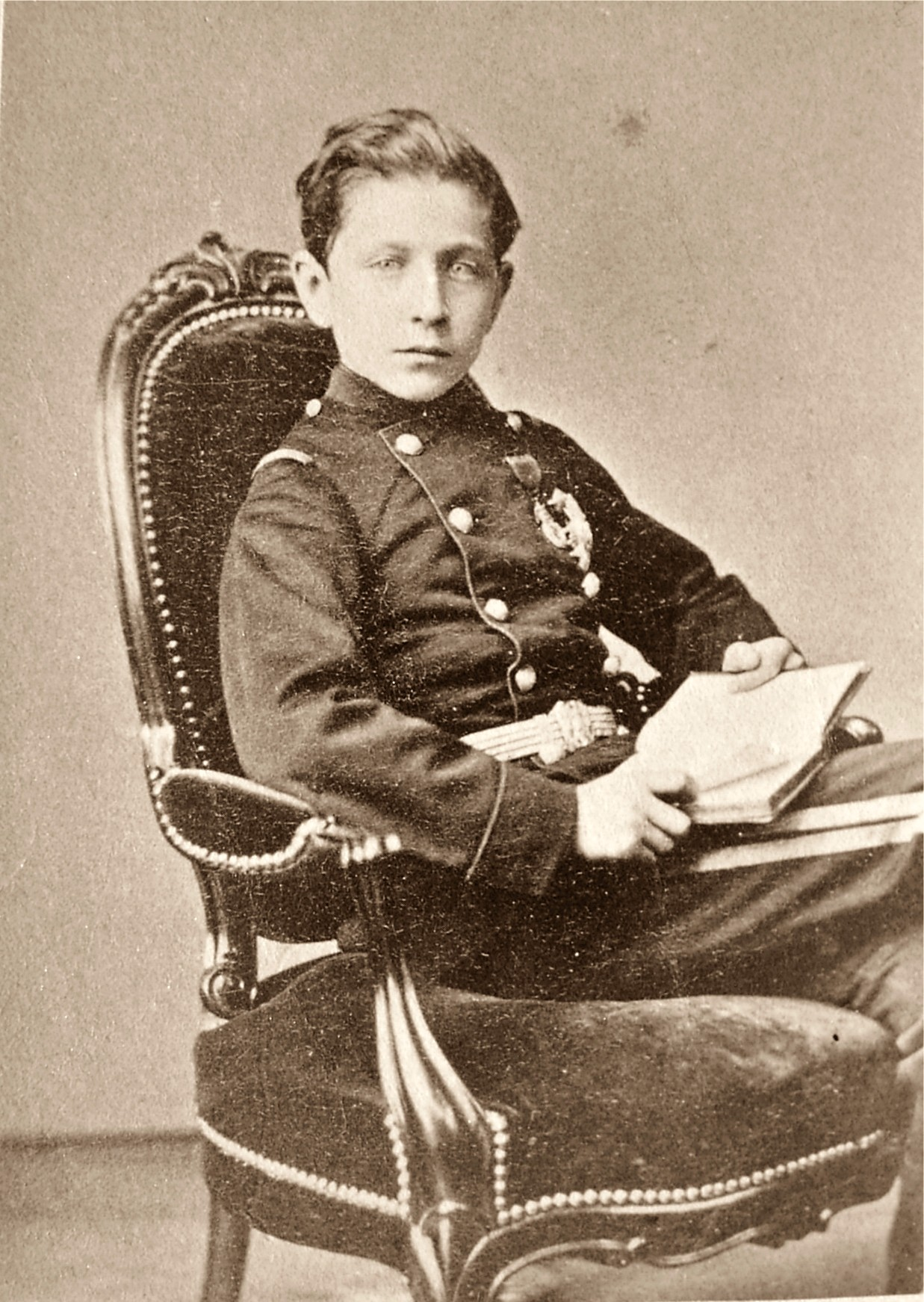
Louis-Napoléon at age 14, 1870

Louis-Napoléon was born at the Tuileries Palace in Paris, and he was baptised on 14 June 1856 at Notre-Dame Cathedral. His godfather was Pope Pius IX, whose representative, Cardinal Patrizi, officiated. His godmother was Eugène de Beauharnais's daughter, Josephine, the Queen of Sweden, who was represented by Grand Duchess Stéphanie of Baden.

His education, after a false start under the academic historian Francis Monnier, was from 1867 supervised by General Frossard as governor, assisted by Augustin Filon as a tutor. His English nurse, Miss Shaw, was recommended by Queen Victoria and taught the prince English from an early age. His valet Xavier Uhlmann and his inseparable friend Louis Conneau also figured prominently in his life. The young prince was known by the nickname "Loulou" in his family circle. In 1868, he visited Corsica and attended the centenary festival of the annexation of the island to France.

At the outbreak of the Franco-Prussian War of 1870–1871, he accompanied his father as a sub-lieutenant to the front. The prince was present on the hills above Saarbrücken during the engagement at their base. Still, when the war began to go against the Imperial army, his father sent him to the border with Belgium. In September, his father sent him a message to cross over into Belgium. He travelled from there to England, arriving on 6 September, where his parents joined him, the Second Empire having been abolished. The family settled in England at Camden Place in Chislehurst, Kent. Upon his father's death in 1873, Bonapartists proclaimed him Napoleon IV. On his 18th birthday, a large crowd gathered to cheer him at Camden Place.

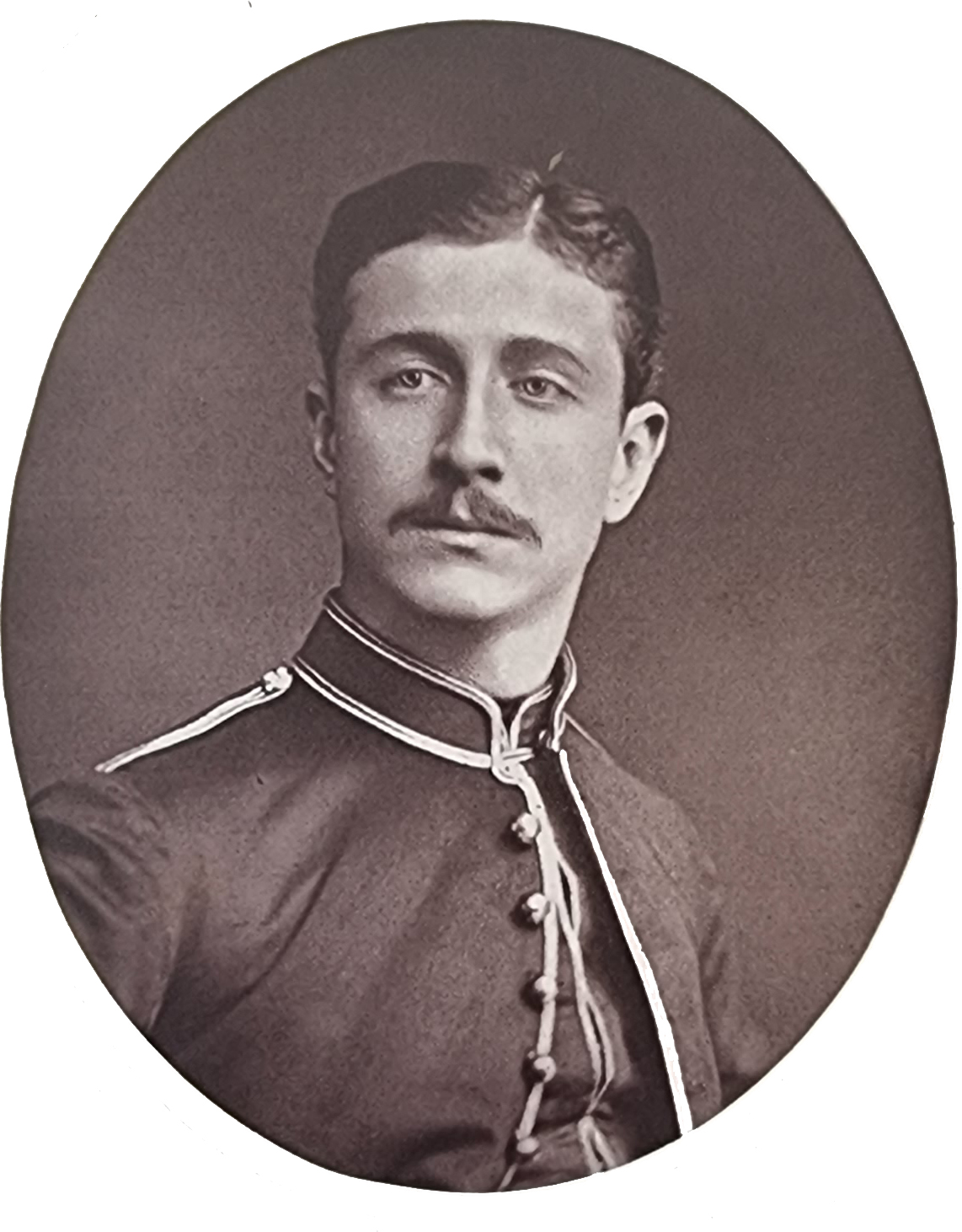
Studio portrait of the Prince Imperial, c. 1875

The prince attended elementary lectures in physics at King's College London. In 1872, he applied and was accepted to the Royal Military Academy, Woolwich. He finished seventh in his class of thirty-four and came top in riding and fencing. He then served for a time with the Royal Artillery at Aldershot.

During the 1870s, there was some talk of a marriage between him and Queen Victoria's youngest daughter, Princess Beatrice. Queen Victoria also reportedly believed that it would be best for "the peace of Europe" if the prince became Emperor of France. The prince remained a devout Catholic, and he retained hopes that the Bonapartist cause might eventually triumph if the secularising Third Republic failed. He supported the tactics of Eugène Rouher over those of Prince Napoléon-Jérôme, breaking with Napoléon-Jérôme in 1876.

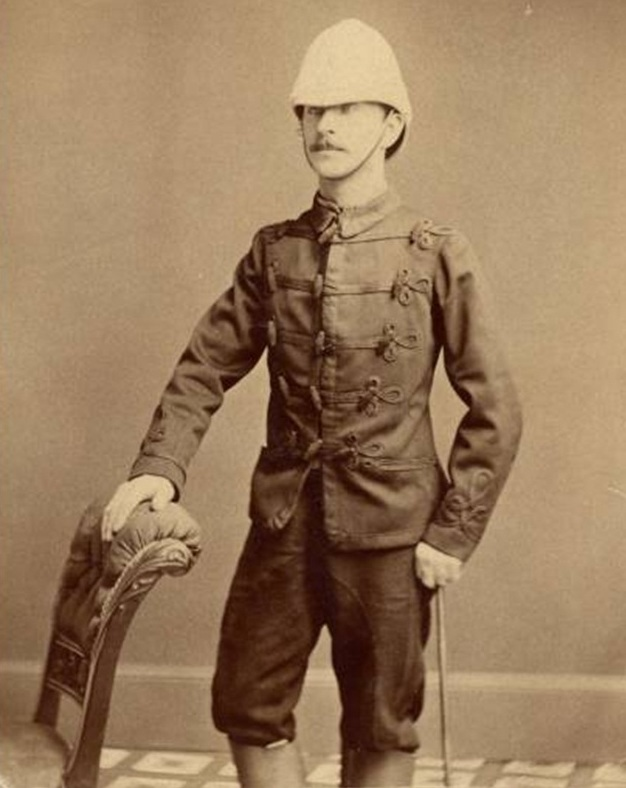
Louis-Napoléon in South Africa

With the outbreak of the Zulu War in 1879, the prince, with the rank of lieutenant, forced the hand of the British military to allow him to take part in the conflict, despite the objections of Rouher and other Bonapartists. He was only allowed to go to Africa by the special pleading of his mother, Empress Eugénie, and by the intervention of Queen Victoria herself. He left England on 27 February 1879 with letters of introduction from the Duke of Cambridge, the British commander-in-chief, in the hope he might be allowed to follow the movements of the troops. Once he arrived at Durban, he joined the General's Head-Quarters and met Frederic Thesiger, 2nd Baron Chelmsford, the commander in South Africa, on 9 April and was nominally placed on his staff. The prince accompanied Chelmsford on his march into Zululand. Keen to see action and full of enthusiasm, he was warned by Lieutenant Arthur Brigge, a close friend, "not to do anything rash and to avoid running unnecessary risks. I reminded him of the Empress at home and his party in France."

Chelmsford, mindful of his duty, attached the prince to the staff of Colonel Richard Harrison of the Royal Engineers, where it was felt he could be active but safe. Harrison was responsible for the column's transport and for reconnaissance of the forward route on the way to Ulundi, the Zulu capital. While he welcomed the presence of the prince, he was told by Chelmsford that the prince must be accompanied at all times by a strong escort. Lieutenant Jahleel Brenton Carey, a French speaker and British subject from Guernsey, was given particular charge of him. The prince took part in several reconnaissance missions. However, his eagerness for action almost led him into an early ambush when he exceeded orders in a party led by Colonel Redvers Buller. Despite this, on the evening of 31 May 1879, Harrison agreed to allow the prince to scout in a forward party scheduled to leave in the morning, mistakenly believing that the path ahead was free of Zulu skirmishers.

=== Death ===
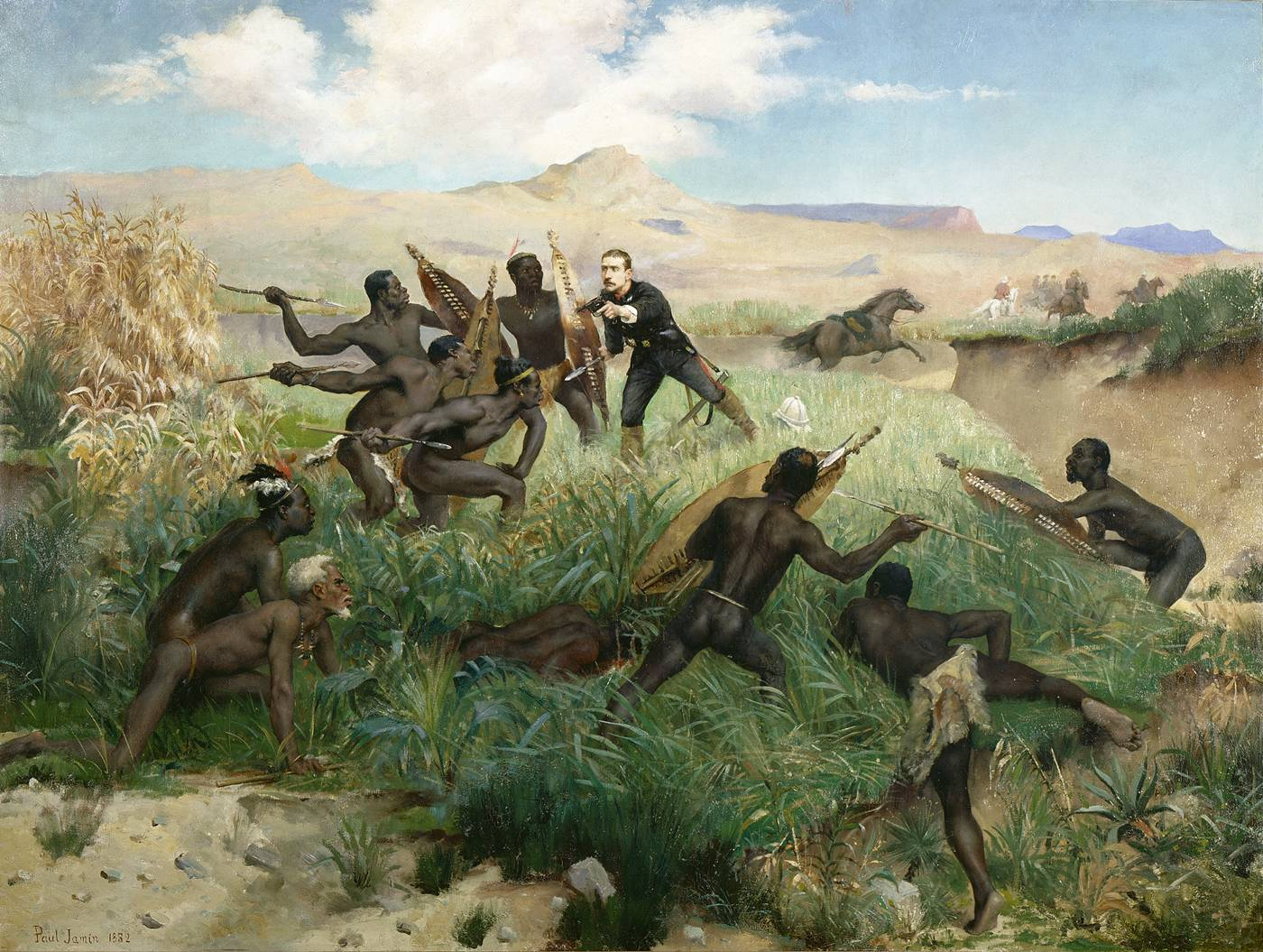
The Death of the Prince Imperial by Paul Jamin (1882)

On the morning of 1 June 1879, the troop set out, earlier than intended and without the whole escort, largely owing to the prince's impatience. Led by Carey, the scouts rode deeper into Zululand. Without Harrison or Buller present to restrain him, the prince took command from Carey, even though the latter had seniority. At noon, the prince halted the troop at a temporarily deserted kraal. The prince and Carey made some sketches of the terrain and used part of the thatch to make a fire. No lookout was posted. As they were preparing to leave, about 40 Zulus fired upon them and rushed towards them, screaming. The prince ran to mount his horse and was able to grab onto the holster on the saddle of his horse. The prince's horse then dashed off before he could mount. After about 90 metres (100 yards), the strap the prince was clinging to broke and the horse kicked the prince in the belly, winding him. The prince fell beneath his horse, and his right arm was trampled. He leapt up, drawing his revolver with his left hand, and started to run, but the Zulus outpaced him.

The prince fired three shots from his revolver at his assailants, but he missed each shot. The prince then fired two more shots, albeit slower, in order to better aim. However, these, too, missed. One of the prince's assailants, a Zulu named Langalibalele, threw his spear at the prince, but missed. Another spear, thrown by a Zulu named Zabanga, struck the prince's left shoulder. The prince tried to fight on, wielding the spear thrown by Langalibalele in his right hand and his revolver in his left. However, weakened by his wounds, the prince sank to the ground and was overwhelmed. Zabanga stabbed the prince again with an assegai, followed by Gwabakana; and then the prince suffered a final blow from Klabawathunga – who stabbed the prince in the right eye – penetrating the prince's brain and killing him. When the prince's corpse was recovered the next day, it was found naked and an examination by surgeon-major F. B. Scott counted 18 wounds, all of which were stab wounds.

According to later testimonies from several of the Zulu men who had participated in the ambush of the prince's patrol, only eight of the stab wounds were inflicted upon the prince while he was still alive – the remaining ten stab wounds were done to the prince's corpse. This was due to the ambushers observing the customary Zulu hlomula ritual, which entailed stabbing the body of an already fallen adversary. The practice was related to the hunt, when all the participants of the hunt were expected to stab the carcass of a particularly formidable kill, like a lion or buffalo. To do the same to a human foe was to acknowledge that he had fought with the ferocity of a dangerous wild animal. Langalibalele confirmed that hlomula was performed on the prince's corpse because he had "fought like a lion". It also transpired from the testimonies of the prince's Zulu assailants that the prince's corpse was found naked because Klabawathunga had ritually stripped the prince's body of all his apparel, except for a few medals and the locket around the prince's neck which contained a picture of his mother. After giving the prince's clothes to another Zulu man named Dabayane to hold onto, Klabawathunga explained that he personally performed a slight incision on the prince's naked abdomen in order to observe the customary Zulu qaqa ritual, which was customarily performed on the corpses of slain foes for the purposes of removing a perceived contagious ritual pollution that followed homicide, called umnyama in isiZulu (meaning 'dark contagion'). It was believed that the swelling that occurred in corpses was due to the homicide victim's soul trying but failing to escape the decaying body, and therefore the killer had a duty to make a hole in their victim to allow the soul to escape lest the killer's own body swell like a corpse. This was the traditional Zulu explanation for the observable swelling of the body which occurs in corpses due to the fermentation of butyric acid in the gut. The prince's bloodstained clothes had meanwhile been removed in order for Klabawathunga to observe the customary Zulu ritual of zila, where a killer was required to wear their victim's clothes (polluted by the harmful influences of his blood) while observing customary ritual abstentions in order to cleanse themself of the crime of homicide. The Zulus had not looted the prince's jewellery because it was seen as a dishonourable thing to do to a warrior, and because it was believed the prince's spirit would haunt them if they stole the jewellery, which was misconstrued for a magical talisman.

Two troopers of the Natal Native Horse, Abel and Rogers, as well the Zulu guide accompanying them, died with the prince during the Zulu ambush. Carey and the four surviving men came together about 50 yards (50 m) from where the prince made his final stand but did not fire at the Zulus. Carey led his men back to camp. The prince's body was recovered the next day. After a court of inquiry, a court-martial, and intervention by Empress Eugénie and Queen Victoria, Carey returned to his regiment. Carey died in Bombay on 22 February 1883.

Louis-Napoléon's death caused an international sensation. Rumours spread in France that the prince had been intentionally "disposed of" by the British. Alternatively, the French republicans or the Freemasons were blamed. In one account, Queen Victoria was accused of arranging the whole thing, a theory that was later dramatised by Maurice Rostand in his play Napoleon IV. The Zulus later claimed that they would not have killed him if they had known who he was. Langalibalele, his chief assailant, was killed in July at the Battle of Ulundi. Eugénie later made a pilgrimage to Sobuza's kraal, where her son had died, and where the Prince Imperial Memorial, paid for by Queen Victoria, had been erected. The prince, who had begged to be allowed to go to war and who had worried his commanders by his dash and daring, was described by Garnet Wolseley, 1st Viscount Wolseley, as "a plucky young man, and he died a soldier's death. What on earth could he have done better?"

His remains were brought back to Spithead on board the British troopship HMS Orontes, and thence transferred onto HMS Enchantress for sailing on to Woolwich Arsenal; overnight, he lay in state in the western octagonal guardhouse by the riverfront. The funeral procession, including Queen Victoria, went from there to Chislehurst, where he was buried in St Mary's Catholic Church. On 9 January 1888, his body was transferred to a special mausoleum constructed by his mother as the Imperial Crypt at St Michael's Abbey, Farnborough, next to his father.

The Prince Imperial had appointed Prince Victor Bonaparte as his heir, thus skipping the genealogically senior heir, Victor's father, Prince Napoléon-Jérôme.

== Legacy ==
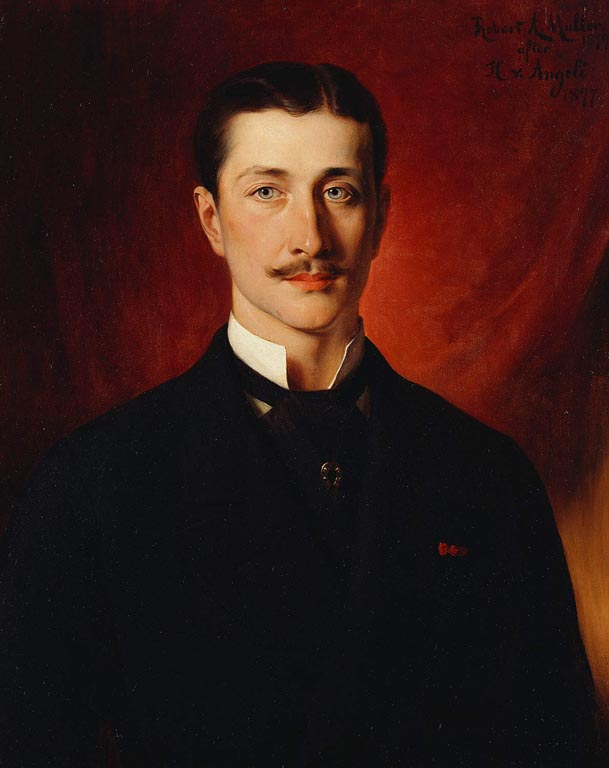
Portrait of Louis-Napoléon, 1877

In 1880, the inhabitants of Chislehurst erected a monument to the Prince Imperial on Chislehurst Common near Camden Place, United Kingdom, which is now Grade II listed. In the 1950s, the road which passes the monument, previously called Station Road, was renamed Prince Imperial Road in his memory. Until 1966 the old STD telephone dialing code using an alphanumeric combination for Chislehurst and Bickley was 467 which spells out IMP, for 'IMPerial'.

The Australian Rules football club Footscray, inspired by the story of the prince's death, renamed their club to the Prince Imperial Football Club in the early 1880s, but they reverted to Footscray two years later.

The asteroid moon Petit-Prince was named after the Prince Imperial in 1998, because it orbits an asteroid named after his mother (45 Eugenia).

== In literature ==
The death is presented in some detail in G. A. Henty's The Young Colonists: A Tale of The Zulu and Boer Wars (1885).

In the R. F. Delderfield novel Long Summer Day (the first of the A Horseman Riding By trilogy), Boer War veteran Paul Craddock buys a farm in 1900 or 1901. The middle-aged estate manager, Rudd, is somewhat embittered at having been one of the soldiers who had failed to rescue the Prince Imperial in 1879. Craddock is aware of the events because, by coincidence, he had been born that very day.

Emma Lazarus wrote sonnets, under the common title of "Destiny", commemorating the prince's birth and death.

The contemporary Italian poet Giosuè Carducci composed a poem in Alcaic stanzas in his memory in 1879 (later in his Odi Barbare), in which he described the Prince's death as follows (vv. 1 - 4) "Questo la inconscia zagaglia barbara / prostrò, spegnendo li occhi di fulgida / vita sorrisi da i fantasmi / fluttuanti ne l'azzurro immenso". ("The unconscious barbarous assegai / prostrated him and extinguished his eyes / of radiant life, at which smiled the ghosts / floating in the immense blue").

In the play Napoleon IV by Maurice Rostand, the prince is killed in a carefully planned ambush arranged with the connivance of Queen Victoria.

In a 1943 Southern Daily Echo article, former Sapper George Harding (2nd Company Royal Engineers) recalled being ordered to take a horse ambulance and find the prince's body and bring it back to the column. The Prince Imperial had been out on reconnaissance mission with a party of the 17th Lancers. Describing the mission, he said

We advanced to a dried-up river bed and had to cut away the banks to get the ambulance across. Eventually, we reached a kraal beside a large mealie field where we found the bodies of the Prince and some of his party. They had been surprised by Zulus as they rested in the kraal. The Zulus broke out of the mealie field and killed them before they could remount their horses. The Prince had been stabbed 16 times with assegais. We made a rough coffin and put his body in the ambulance. After burying the other bodies where they were found, we went back to the column. The Prince's body was taken back to England for burial.

The Hideous Silence (BBC Radio, 1975) by Michael Robson, broadcast on BBC Radio 4’s Saturday Night Theatre is rooted in the historical controversy surrounding the death of Louis-Napoléon. The play is set years after the event in colonial India, focusing on the disgraced British Army officer, Lieutenant Jahleel Brenton Carey, whose career and honour were destroyed by his connection to the Prince's death. The play and its title concerns the years of ostracisation that Carey endured, leading to his pitiful death in Bombay in 1883.

The Prince Imperial is a minor character in Donald Serrell Thomas's Sherlock Holmes pastiche novel Death on a Pale Horse (2013).

== Titles, styles, honours and arms ==
Styles of Louis-Napoléon, Prince Imperial
- Reference style: His Imperial Highness
- Spoken style: Your Imperial Highness

He was styled Prince Imperial of France from birth.

=== French honours ===
- Knight Grand Cross of the Legion of Honour

=== Foreign honours ===
- Austrian Empire: Grand Cross of the Order of St. Stephen, 1865
- Denmark: Knight of the Order of the Elephant, 11 March 1865
- Mexican Empire:
  - Grand Cross of the Order of Guadalupe, 1864
  - Grand Cross of the Order of the Mexican Eagle, 1865
- Kingdom of Portugal:
  - Grand Cross of the Order of the Tower and Sword, 1861
  - Grand Cross of the Sash of the Two Orders, 1865
- Russian Empire: Knight of the Order of St. Andrew the First-called, 30 May 1865.
- Kingdom of Sardinia: Knight of the Order of the Annunciation, 20 February 1859
- Kingdom of Saxony: Knight of the Order of the Rue Crown, 1857
- Spain: Knight of the Order of the Golden Fleece, 30 March 1856
- Sweden-Norway: Knight of the Royal Order of the Seraphim, 14 June 1856

=== Arms ===
Coat of arms of the Prince Imperial

Imperial Standard

Monogram of the Prince Imperial

== See also ==
- Railway of the Prince Imperial
- L'Empereur, sa femme et le petit prince

Louis-Napoléon, Prince Imperial of France House of Bonaparte Born: 16 March 1856 Died: 1 June 1879
Titles in pretence
Preceded by Napoleon III	— TITULAR — Emperor of the French; Bonapartist claimant 9 January 1873 – 1 June 1879; Reason for succession failure: Empire abolished in 1870	Succeeded by Napoléon V Jérôme or Napoléon V Victor
French royalty
Preceded by Jérôme Bonaparte	Heir to the French throne 16 March 1856 – 4 September 1870	Empire abolished
