= Beniamino Filon =

Italian Roman Catholic priest (1900–1948)

Venerable Beniamino Filon O.F.M. Cap.
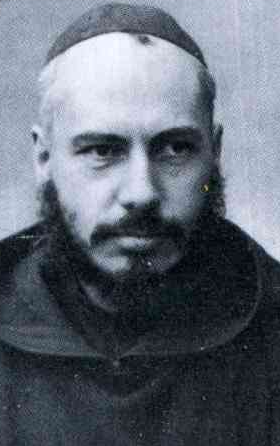
- Filon c. 1945.
- Born: 2 August 1900; Balduina di San Urbano, Padua, Kingdom of Italy
- Died: 21 July 1948 (aged 47); Lourdes, Hautes-Pyrénées, France
- Venerated in: Roman Catholic Church
- Attributes: Franciscan habit

Beniamino Filon (2 August 1900 - 21 July 1948) - in religious Giacomo da Balduina - was an Italian Roman Catholic priest and a professed member from the Order of Friars Minor Capuchin. Filon studied in Rovigo before being summoned to Milan for mandated service in the armed forces towards the close of World War I but following it was able to resume his studies in Bassano del Grappa. He was ordained to the priesthood and spent a brief respite in Slovenia due to a disease he was suffering from. He remained for most of his time as a friar listening to confessions in Udine but died in 1948 in Lourdes while on a pilgrimage.

Filon's cause for beatification launched in the 1980s and he became titled as a Servant of God while the confirmation of his life of heroic virtue enabled for Pope Francis to name him as Venerable on 16 June 2017.

== Life ==
Beniamino Filon was born in Balduina di San Urbano on 2 August 1900 as the eighth of ten children to the modest farmers Giacomo Filon (d. 11 March 1924) and Giuseppina Marin (d. 31 July 1932) who were married in Padua on 24 March 1887. He received baptism on 5 August 1900 from Cristiano Sartori with the names Beniamino Angelo; his godparents were Angelo Bertoet and Maddalena Sartori.

On 18 April 1910 he received his Confirmation from the Bishop of Padua Luigi Pellizzo and then his First Communion on 2 April 1911 in his hometown from Eugenio Bau.

Filon attended school from 1906 until 1909 and then attended school in Lendinara from 1910 until 1914. It was in Lendinara that he had his first encounters with friars from the Order of Friars Minor Capuchin; he became impressed with their order and so began visiting them and decided that he wished to enter their order which he did on 13 October 1917 with the beginning of his ecclesial studies in Rovigo.

On 20 March 1918 he was called to Milan for mandated service with the armed forces due to World War I. He remained in the armed forces for his service until 1921. He began his novitiate in Bassano del Grappa on 28 September 1922 at which point he was vested in the Franciscan habit and assumed his religious name. He made his initial profession into the order on 29 September 1923. Filon's studies in Thiene in Vicenza were interrupted on 3 July 1924 when he was transferred for his education at Santissimo Redentore in Venice. During his theological studies around 1925 he began feeling the effects of the disease encephalitis lethargica that led to doubts for his proceeding towards ordination. His superiors feared his premature death and so decided to dispense him from the final part of his theological formation so that he could be ordained but he did make his solemn profession on 8 December 1926. He received his ordination to the priesthood from the Cardinal Patriarch of Venice Pietro La Fontaine in the church of Saint Nicholas of Tolentino on 21 July 1929. He celebrated his first Mass in his hometown on 4 August 1929. Filon's suffering increased at a gradual rate but he offered his suffering for the salvation of souls and the sanctification of priests. He spent a brief respite in Koper in Slovenia and then on 28 November 1931 arrived in Udine where he would live but first underwent a thorough examination. The doctors diagnosed him with postencephalitic parkinsonism on 29 September 1932. His cell was positioned on the first floor to act as a confessional where he would hear penitents due to his disease. On 15 September 1941 he made a pilgrimage to Loreto and then made another one there in 1946.

Filon's renown in the confessional became great to the point that people called him "santo confessore". There were some penitents that often said that Filon could mention their faults to them before having the chance to speak with people comparing it to Padre Pio's reading of hearts.

Pietro Baldassi - a priest who served the Unione Nazionale Italiana Transporto Ammalati a Lourdes Santuari Internazionali - knew just how ill Filon was and so invited him to make a pilgrimage to Lourdes. He left on 19 July 1948 (he celebrated his final Mass that morning) via train reaching Lourdes but could not proceed from there to the grotto as he had hoped. The next evening his condition worsened. He experienced great pain at 11:00pm on 21 July with his breathing becoming labored. He lost consciousness and woke sometime later and so received the Anointing of the Sick when the pain continued but died just moments later while singing the Magnificat. His funeral was held on 23 July and he was buried in a wooden coffin. His remains were interred in Lourdes but on 15 October 1949 his remains were exhumed to be placed in another grave in a coffin of oak lined with zinc and exhumed once more on 9 June 1997.

== Beatification process ==
The beatification process launched on 15 October 1982 after the Congregation for the Causes of Saints granted the official "nihil obstat" (no objections to launching the cause) decree thus titling him as a Servant of God. The cognitional process to investigate Filon and his reputation for holiness opened on 25 February 1984 and was concluded later on 18 November 1989. The C.C.S. validated this process on 11 March 1994 as having complied with their regulations for conducting causes.

The postulation submitted the Positio dossier on 21 July 2001 to the C.C.S. for further assessment. Nine theologians approved the dossier on 13 October 2016 as did the cardinal and bishop members of the C.C.S. some months later. Pope Francis named Filon as being Venerable on 16 June 2017 upon confirming that the late friar had lived a life of heroic virtue.

Filon's beatification depends upon the confirmation of a miracle that in most cases is a healing that science and medicine cannot explain. The diocesan investigation for such a case was called for in September 2016 and was launched on 11 February 2017.

The current postulator for this cause is the Capuchin friar Carlo Calloni.
