= Charles Auguste Désiré Filon =

French historian

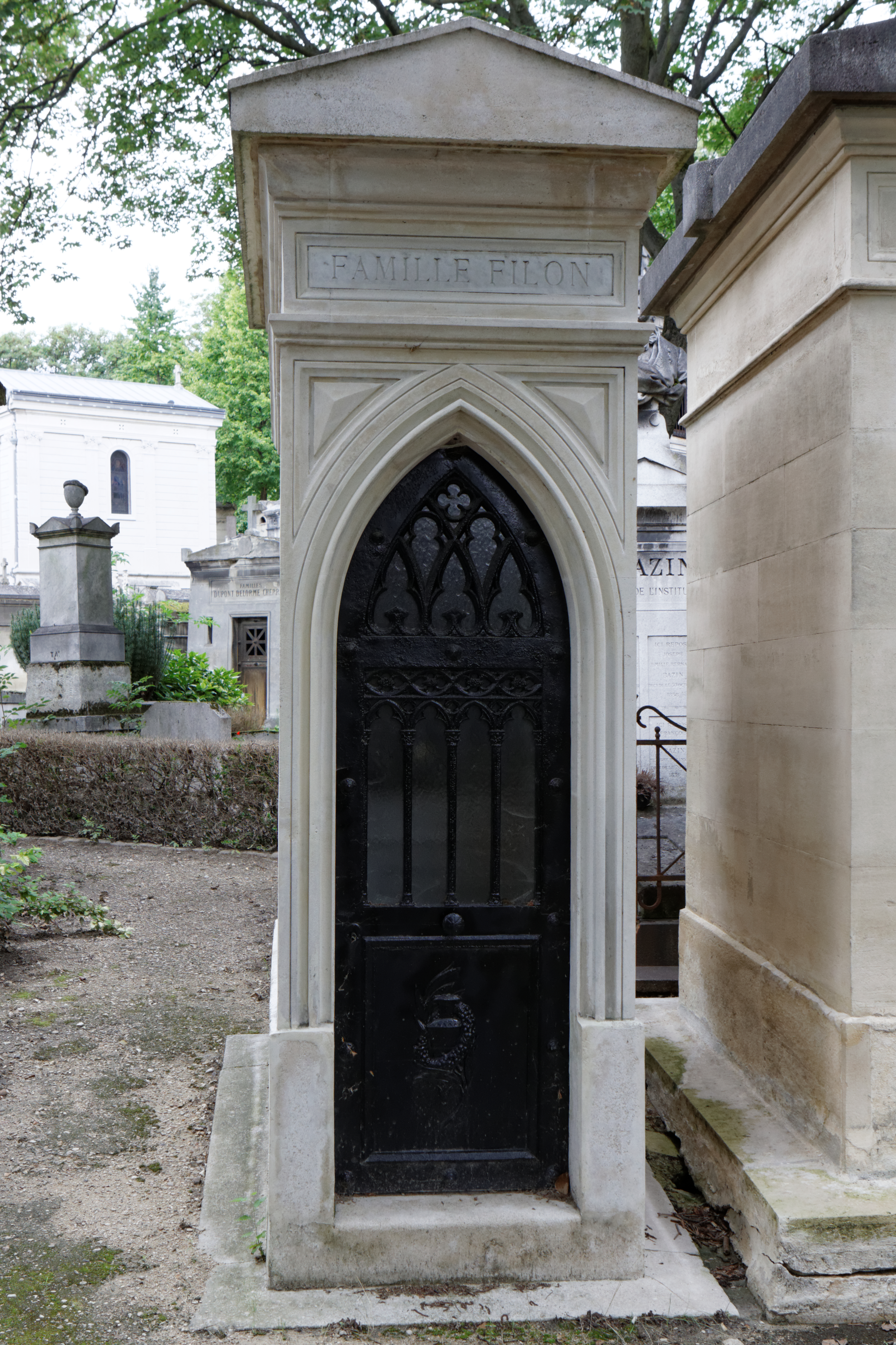
Père Lachaise cemetery.

Charles Auguste Désiré Filon (1800–1875) was a French historian. He became professor of history at Douai, at École normale supérieure, and eventually inspecteur d'académie in Paris. His son, Augustin was also distinguished in the field of learning.

His principal works were:

- Histoire comparée de la France et de l'Angleterre (1832)
- Histoire de l'Europe au XVI^{e} siècle (1838)
- La Diplomatie française sous Louis XV (1843)
- Histoire de l'Italie méridionale (1849)
- Histoire du Sinai romain (1850)
- Histoire de la démocratie athénienne (1854).
